= List of tornadoes in the outbreak of April 4–7, 2022 =

From April 4–7, 2022, a significant tornado outbreak took place across the southeastern portions of the United States, spawning 89 tornadoes as a result.

== Confirmed tornadoes ==
=== April 4 event ===
List of confirmed tornadoes – Monday, April 4, 2022 (Note: All dates are based on the local time zone where the tornado touched down; however, all times are in Coordinated Universal Time for consistency.)
EF#	Location	County / Parish	State	Start Coord.	Time (UTC)	Path length	Max width
EF0	E of Wauchula	Hardee	FL	27.55°N 81.6998°W	23:46–23:47	0.25 mi (0.40 km)	25 yd (23 m)
EF0	Law enforcement relayed video of a small, short-lived rope tornado. Power lines were reported down in the area.						
EF1	Blue Ridge	Collin	TX	33.2982°N 96.4049°W	02:32–02:36	0.28 mi (0.45 km)	188 yd (172 m)
EF1	A brief tornado ripped a large section of metal roofing from two small workshop and farm outbuildings. Wooden roof panels were ripped from a small barn, and the walls of another metal outbuilding were collapsed. Multiple homes in Blue Ridge sustained roof damage, including one that suffered severe damage to its roof and roof decking. The metal roof canopy of a car wash and a few trees were damaged as well.						
EF2	NW of Joshua to E of Egan	Johnson	TX	32.483°N 97.4275°W	03:41–03:54	9.72 mi (15.64 km)	150 yd (140 m)
EF2	This tornado moved through both Joshua and Egan, with the most significant damage occurring in the latter community. One home near Egan sustained heavy damage, losing most of its roof, and a few manufactured homes were damaged, along with several metal buildings at a business. Many trees were downed as well. One person was injured.						
EF0	N of Keene	Johnson	TX	32.4195°N 97.3302°W	03:49–03:53	1.68 mi (2.70 km)	75 yd (69 m)
EF0	A small tornado downed trees and caused minor roof damage.						
EF0	N of Alvarado	Johnson	TX	32.4657°N 97.241°W	03:58–04:06	4.87 mi (7.84 km)	200 yd (180 m)
EF0	Roofs, outbuildings, animal homes, and trees all sustained minor damage.						
EF0	N of Venus	Johnson	TX	32.4518°N 97.1176°W	04:06–04:10	2.82 mi (4.54 km)	50 yd (46 m)
EF0	A tornado damaged the roofs and awnings of two residences, along with nearby outbuildings. Trees were downed as well.						
EF0	WSW of Midlothian	Ellis	TX	32.4769°N 97.0556°W	04:13–04:15	1.44 mi (2.32 km)	30 yd (27 m)
EF0	Homes sustained roof damaged, and trees were downed.						

=== April 5 event ===
List of confirmed tornadoes – Tuesday, April 5, 2022
EF#	Location	County / Parish	State	Start Coord.	Time (UTC)	Path length	Max width
EF1	NW of Downsville	Lincoln, Union	LA	32.6958°N 92.5409°W	08:45–08:49	5.09 mi (8.19 km)	150 yd (140 m)
EF1	Tin roofing was torn off a metal barn, and numerous trees were downed.						
EF1	S of Pulaski	Scott	MS	32.2334°N 89.6569°W	11:46–11:57	7.59 mi (12.21 km)	100 yd (91 m)
EF1	Numerous trees were downed in the Bienville National Forest, with a couple falling on a carport and an RV.						
EF1	SSE of Forest	Scott	MS	32.2587°N 89.4501°W	12:00–12:06	4.67 mi (7.52 km)	300 yd (270 m)
EF1	Numerous trees and several power lines were downed in the Bienville National Forest, and outbuildings sustained roof damage.						
EF1	N of Prentiss	Jefferson Davis	MS	31.6657°N 89.8662°W	12:06–12:10	3.06 mi (4.92 km)	100 yd (91 m)
EF1	A majority of the metal roofing was ripped from a manufactured home and a small shed, and another manufactured home suffered partial roof removal. Numerous trees were snapped or uprooted as well.						
EF1	S of Lake	Scott, Newton	MS	32.2996°N 89.3324°W	12:09–12:12	2.14 mi (3.44 km)	100 yd (91 m)
EF1	Doors on a farm building were damaged, and several trees were downed.						
EF2	NNE of Prentiss to NW of Collins	Jefferson Davis, Covington	MS	31.6955°N 89.8325°W	12:09–12:26	14.76 mi (23.75 km)	400 yd (370 m)
EF2	One home lost a portion of its roof and its porch awning, while a nearby detached structure sustained significant roof damage, with debris strewn into a nearby field. Power poles and numerous large trees were snapped or uprooted, and one tree fell onto a mobile home. Several other homes, mobile homes, and a barn sustained roof and siding damage.						
EF1	Lawrence to Newton	Newton	MS	32.3229°N 89.2222°W	12:16–12:21	4.03 mi (6.49 km)	100 yd (91 m)
EF1	This tornado touched down in Lawrence, where a shed was damaged, and trees were downed. Between Lawrence and Newton, more trees were downed, a shed was destroyed, and another building was heavily damaged. A home sustained roof damage, and a fence was damaged in Newton before the tornado dissipated.						
EF1	NW of Collins to NW of Ellisville	Covington, Jones	MS	31.6975°N 89.6465°W	12:22–12:42	16.52 mi (26.59 km)	440 yd (400 m)
EF1	A couple homes sustained significant roof damage, and trees were downed.						
EF1	SE of Ellisville to WSW of Strengthford	Jones	MS	31.5631°N 89.1551°W	12:56–13:07	8.56 mi (13.78 km)	250 yd (230 m)
EF1	A shed and a metal barn were damaged, power lines were downed, and numerous trees were snapped or uprooted before the tornado dissipated in the De Soto National Forest.						
EF1	NW of Shubuta	Clarke	MS	31.9392°N 88.8424°W	13:06–13:09	2.87 mi (4.62 km)	250 yd (230 m)
EF1	A partially-built house was collapsed, the roof of a manufactured home was damaged, one shed was demolished, and a second shed was blown away. Another house had tin roofing peeled off, and a utility pole fell onto another home. Trees were snapped or uprooted as well.						
EF2	S of Whistler	Wayne	MS	31.6636°N 88.8118°W	13:14–13:18	2.21 mi (3.56 km)	250 yd (230 m)
EF2	A strong tornado caused significant deforestation in a wooded area, with numerous large trees snapped near their bases.						
EF0	Whynot	Lauderdale	MS	32.2828°N 88.5065°W	13:18–13:22	2.55 mi (4.10 km)	25 yd (23 m)
EF0	Numerous trees were snapped or uprooted.						
EF1	SE of Whistler	Wayne	MS	31.6704°N 88.7751°W	13:19–13:22	2.56 mi (4.12 km)	100 yd (91 m)
EF1	Numerous trees were snapped or uprooted, including by a potential satellite tornado. A couple homes sustained minor roof damage. A carport was lofted about 40 ft (12 m) into a tree.						
EF1	N of Denham	Wayne	MS	31.6856°N 88.531°W	13:36–13:37	0.29 mi (0.47 km)	50 yd (46 m)
EF1	A brief tornado snapped or uprooted numerous trees, several of which fell on a home and caused damage.						
EF2	NNE of Bladon Springs to W of McEntyre	Choctaw, Clarke	AL	31.7731°N 88.1682°W	14:03–14:14	9.46 mi (15.22 km)	800 yd (730 m)
EF2	A large multiple-vortex tornado mowed down countless trees in forested areas, in addition to inflicting minor to moderate roof damage to homes. In November 2023, this tornado was reanalyzed and had its width adjusted due to an additional area of snapped trees noted on Worldview satellite imagery.						
EF1	NNE of Coffeeville	Clarke	AL	31.797°N 88.0528°W	14:10–14:13	1.83 mi (2.95 km)	100 yd (91 m)
EF1	A brief satellite tornado moved around the southern periphery of the previous EF2 tornado. It snapped or uprooted trees and ripped significant portions of roofing and siding from a barn.						
EF1	E of Beatrice	Monroe	AL	31.7302°N 87.1352°W	15:10–15:13	1.52 mi (2.45 km)	75 yd (69 m)
EF1	Numerous trees were snapped or uprooted.						
EF2	E of Wetumpka	Elmore	AL	32.5183°N 86.2036°W	15:54–16:00	4.36 mi (7.02 km)	900 yd (820 m)
EF2	Significant tree damage was observed in a forested area, where a large swath of trees was completely flattened.						
EF2	N of Petrey (1st tornado)	Crenshaw	AL	31.8712°N 86.2108°W	15:56–15:59	1.34 mi (2.16 km)	250 yd (230 m)
EF2	A brief but strong tornado snapped a large swath of trees and destroyed a chicken house. The roof of a church was damaged as well.						
EF2	NE of Petrey to SE of Pine Level	Pike, Montgomery	AL	31.8960°N 86.1267°W	16:03–16:18	12.68 mi (20.41 km)	1,100 yd (1,000 m)
EF2	Numerous trees were snapped or uprooted by this large tornado, including one that fell on a house, and some other homes suffered minor roof damage. A manufactured home was shifted off its foundation, a guyed transmission tower was toppled, and a metal barn was destroyed as well.						
EF0	SE of Eclectic to Burlington	Elmore	AL	32.5728°N 86.0225°W	16:06–16:13	5.31 mi (8.55 km)	300 yd (270 m)
EF0	Numerous trees were downed, some of which caused structural damage. A few homes sustained minor roof, soffit, and fascia damage directly from winds, and a carport was blown off a home before the tornado dissipated in Burlington.						
EF1	N of Franklin	Macon	AL	32.4656°N 85.8051°W	16:19–16:24	4.35 mi (7.00 km)	250 yd (230 m)
EF1	Numerous trees were snapped or uprooted.						
EFU	N of Petrey (2nd tornado)	Crenshaw	AL	31.8712°N 86.2108°W	16:20–16:21	0.43 mi (0.69 km)	25 yd (23 m)
EFU	A tornado touched down near the starting point of the first Petrey tornado, making the damage indistinguishable from the earlier tornado. The tornado was confirmed via data from the NOAA PERiLs field campaign, sentinel satellite imagery, and third-party pressure data. The path width, path length, and specific damage were inconclusive, and no rating could be determined.						
EF0	NNE of Tallassee	Tallapoosa	AL	32.6498°N 85.8352°W	16:22–16:25	1.75 mi (2.82 km)	110 yd (100 m)
EF0	Several trees were downed, a few of which resulted in structural damage.						
EF1	N of Orion to ESE of China Grove	Montgomery, Pike	AL	31.9833°N 86.0358°W	16:34–16:45	7.56 mi (12.17 km)	550 yd (500 m)
EF1	A few homes sustained minor roof and siding damage, and numerous trees were snapped or uprooted.						
EF0	WSW of Lafayette	Chambers	AL	32.8765°N 85.5300°W	16:45–16:46	0.44 mi (0.71 km)	200 yd (180 m)
EF0	An outbuilding was damaged, and a few trees were snapped or uprooted.						
EF1	SW of Union Springs	Bullock	AL	32.0402°N 85.8342°W	16:50–16:52	1.58 mi (2.54 km)	600 yd (550 m)
EF1	Numerous trees were snapped or uprooted.						
EF1	N of Eufaula	Barbour	AL	31.9176°N 85.1598°W	17:38–17:40	1.54 mi (2.48 km)	200 yd (180 m)
EF1	A tornado moved through forested land, snapping or uprooted trees. One large tree fell on a house, rendering it uninhabitable.						
EF1	NNE of Cusseta	Chattahoochee	GA	32.3804°N 84.756°W	18:04–18:09	6.72 mi (10.81 km)	300 yd (270 m)
EF1	A tornado began on the east side of Fort Benning, snapping or uprooting trees.						
EF0	NW of Headland	Henry	AL	31.3940°N 85.4025°W	18:24-18:27	2.77 mi (4.46 km)	50 yd (46 m)
EF0	A few trees were downed.						
EF1	N of Mauk	Taylor	GA	32.5325°N 84.4431°W	18:29–18:35	3.04 mi (4.89 km)	150 yd (140 m)
EF1	Trees were snapped or uprooted, a chicken house was almost completely destroyed, a barn was completely collapsed, and homes were damaged by either winds damaging the roof or trees falling on them. A narrow path of intense ground scouring was found in an open field, where large clumps of grass and sod were pulled up.						
EF0	W of Malvern to Rehobeth	Geneva, Houston	AL	31.1445°N 85.5518°W	18:38–18:47	6.84 mi (11.01 km)	200 yd (180 m)
EF0	A weak tornado moved through Malvern, displacing the stairway of one home about 5 ft (1.5 m) and removing roof material from an adjacent manufactured home. The wall of another manufactured home was impaled by a wooden projectile. A few outbuildings were damaged and large trees were snapped or uprooted, two of which fell onto homes.						
EF1	N of Malvern	Geneva	AL	31.1497°N 85.5123°W	18:39–18:40	0.19 mi (0.31 km)	50 yd (46 m)
EF1	This very brief tornado touched down in a field and caused crop damage. It then destroyed a well-built carport, pulling anchor bolts from concrete and lag bolts from wooden posts. The tornado occurred simultaneously with the previous tornado.						
EF1	NE of Butler	Taylor	GA	32.615°N 84.2418°W	18:50–18:59	7.20 mi (11.59 km)	300 yd (270 m)
EF1	The same storm that produced the first EF1 tornado in Taylor County cycled and produced this tornado. Trees were snapped or uprooted, and a mill sustained roof damage.						
EF0	Cowarts	Houston	AL	31.1932°N 85.3078°W	18:53–18:54	0.07 mi (0.11 km)	25 yd (23 m)
EF0	This very brief tornado downed several trees in Cowarts, a couple of which fell onto the side of a home and on top of a car. A few outbuildings sustained roof damage as well.						
EF1	Fountainville to NE of Montezuma	Macon	GA	32.307°N 84.169°W	19:01–19:24	17.33 mi (27.89 km)	250 yd (230 m)
EF1	Numerous trees were snapped or uprooted, and several buildings at the Whitewater Creek Park were damaged. A Tyson Foods plant and a nearby manufactured home both sustained minor damage, and a small outbuilding was destroyed.						
EF1	SW of Roberta to ENE of Knoxville	Crawford	GA	32.6957°N 84.056°W	19:07–19:19	8.83 mi (14.21 km)	200 yd (180 m)
EF1	Near the beginning of the path, two barns were destroyed, a third was severely damaged, and a house sustained significant roof and window damage. On the southwest side of Roberta, two other homes sustained roof and siding damage, a shed was flipped onto its roof, and a car was crushed by a falling tree. Elsewhere, several more homes sustained minor roof damage. Many trees were downed along the path.						
EF1	S of Cuba	Early, Miller	GA	31.2568°N 84.9327°W	19:15–19:21	7.14 mi (11.49 km)	50 yd (46 m)
EF1	Numerous trees were snapped or uprooted, and a house sustained damage to its roof.						
EF1	N of Cuba	Early	GA	31.296°N 84.9101°W	19:15–19:21	4.94 mi (7.95 km)	50 yd (46 m)
EF1	Trees were snapped or uprooted, and a few homes sustained roof damage.						
EF2	E of Byromville	Dooly	GA	32.1890°N 83.8806°W	19:26–19:33	5.8 mi (9.3 km)	300 yd (270 m)
EF2	Five large, anchored grain bins were destroyed, with 4-foot (1.2 m) concrete anchors being ripped out of the ground and a 6-inch (15 cm) steel beam attached to one of the anchors being bent. Some steel paneling from the bins was thrown up to a half mile away. A mesonet station run by the University of Georgia was hit by the tornado, damaging the station. However, the station continued to measure wind and pressure readings, recording a wind gust of 129.3 mph (208.1 km/h). Adjacent to the station, a semi-trailer was ripped from its rig and thrown 30 feet (9.1 m). Further to the east, at least six irrigation towers were rolled, and a few barns and outbuildings were destroyed. A house sustained roof damage before the tornado dissipated just northwest of Pinehurst. Many trees were snapped or uprooted along the path.						
EF1	Northwestern Macon	Bibb	GA	32.8716°N 83.697°W	19:33–19:36	2.02 mi (3.25 km)	150 yd (140 m)
EF1	A brief tornado touched down north of Payne in the northwestern part of Macon. A church steeple was heavily damaged, several houses sustained mostly minor roof damage, and trees were snapped or uprooted.						
EF3	Bonaire	Houston	GA	32.5480°N 83.6024°W	19:49–19:56	3.89 mi (6.26 km)	820 yd (750 m)
EF3	Two large high-tension electrical transmission towers were destroyed, and a large concrete power pole was snapped near the base by this high-end EF3 tornado. Multiple homes in Bonaire were significantly damaged, with one being completely destroyed and another losing large sections of its roof and second story. Other homes sustained minor to moderate damage, and numerous large trees were snapped or uprooted as well. One person sustained minor injuries.						
EF3	SW of Allendale to NE of Sycamore	Allendale	SC	32.9286°N 81.3756°W	19:50–20:10	13.28 mi (21.37 km)	1,000 yd (910 m)
EF3	A low-end EF3 wedge tornado, which prompted the issuance of a tornado emergency, touched down southwest of Allendale and moved through rural areas towards town, quickly reaching peak intensity and obliterating a couple of anchored mobile homes, scattering their debris across fields and into trees. The metal frame of one of the mobile homes was thrown a considerable distance and one person was injured in this area. The tornado then weakened but remained strong as continued to move northeastward, snapping trees and downing power lines. As it crossed US 278 at the southeast edge of Allendale, it destroyed a block and steel-construction warehouse and knocked over a large fiberglass tank. The tornado then weakened further as it moved through Sycamore, downing trees, causing minor structural damage, and overturning a pivot irrigation sprinkler before dissipating to the northeast of town. Numerous large trees were snapped and denuded along the path, and power poles were snapped as well.						
EF0	N of Newton	Baker	GA	31.38°N 84.33°W	19:51-19:52	0.64 mi (1.03 km)	25 yd (23 m)
EF0	A trained spotter reported a tornado with trees snapped in the area.						
EF0	WNW of Milledgeville	Baldwin	GA	33.095°N 83.3493°W	20:01–20:03	1.69 mi (2.72 km)	150 yd (140 m)
EF0	Over 100 trees were snapped or uprooted.						
EF1	S of Jeffersonville to NW of Nicklesville	Twiggs, Wilkinson	GA	32.6484°N 83.3773°W	20:11–20:22	12.35 mi (19.88 km)	400 yd (370 m)
EF1	A high-end EF1 tornado caused significant damage to several homes, including one that had its attached garage destroyed, and another that sustained collapse of its chimney and roof, with a significant amount of it roof covering removed. A manufactured home was also shifted and heavily damaged, and many trees were snapped or uprooted along the path.						
EF1	NW of Sale City	Mitchell, Colquitt	GA	31.3206°N 84.1347°W	20:12–20:19	8.1 mi (13.0 km)	50 yd (46 m)
EF1	A tornado uplifted and destroyed a carport, moved a small house off its foundation, and snapped or uprooted many trees.						
EF1	SE of Cochran to SW of Chester	Bleckley, Dodge	GA	32.3497°N 83.3145°W	20:14–20:23	7.62 mi (12.26 km)	125 yd (114 m)
EF1	The second story of a frail home was removed, another home sustained roof and carport damage, and several trees were snapped or uprooted.						
EF1	W of Ehrhardt	Bamberg	SC	33.0736°N 81.0799°W	20:18–20:27	3.73 mi (6.00 km)	250 yd (230 m)
EF1	A tornado destroyed a shed, blew the roof and walls off another shed, and removed a portion of the tin roof from a house. Multiple vehicles and a small tractor were spun and shifted, shingles and siding were ripped off of a second house, and many large trees were snapped or uprooted.						
EF0	S of Abbeville	Wilcox, Dodge	GA	31.9286°N 83.3573°W	20:20–20:29	9.38 mi (15.10 km)	200 yd (180 m)
EF0	One manufactured home was destroyed and another was overturned. Multiple trees were snapped or uprooted. Multiple campers at a hunting camp were damaged or destroyed. Numerous trees were uprooted, some of which fell on buildings.						
EF1	N of Chester	Bleckley, Laurens	GA	32.4398°N 83.1547°W	20:30–20:33	1.78 mi (2.86 km)	250 yd (230 m)
EF1	Hundreds of trees were snapped or uprooted. This tornado formed shortly after the Bleckley/Dodge County EF1 tornado dissipated.						
EF0	NE of Ehrhardt	Bamberg	SC	33.1807°N 80.9262°W	20:39–20:41	2.35 mi (3.78 km)	200 yd (180 m)
EF0	Trees were downed sporadically along the path.						
EF0	E of Branchville	Orangeburg	SC	33.2472°N 80.7916°W	20:53–20:55	0.99 mi (1.59 km)	50 yd (46 m)
EF0	A brief tornado touched down on the athletic fields adjacent to Branchville High School, removing the metal roof from an equipment shed, ripping fencing from the baseball field backstop, and displacing bleachers. Portions of a roof were ripped from a structure as well.						
EF0	SW of Bowman	Orangeburg	SC	33.334°N 80.6961°W	21:07–21:09	0.76 mi (1.22 km)	200 yd (180 m)
EF0	A farm equipment storage barn had portions of its tin exterior removed. An unanchored helicopter was shifted more than 90 degrees, and six acres of panels were damaged at a solar farm.						
EF0	NNE of Soperton	Treutlen	GA	32.4624°N 82.5512°W	21:10–21:13	0.88 mi (1.42 km)	100 yd (91 m)
EF0	Several trees were snapped or uprooted.						
EF1	NE of Soperton	Treutlen	GA	32.4467°N 82.4260°W	21:17–21:18	0.78 mi (1.26 km)	200 yd (180 m)
EF1	Several barns and outbuildings were destroyed as a result of this high-end EF1 tornado, and two homes were damaged, both of which had their carports torn off, which resulted in partial roof loss. Sheet metal debris from structures was scattered for hundreds of yards. A double-wide mobile home was moved off its foundation and had significant siding and shingle loss, and over 100 trees were snapped or uprooted. More outbuildings were damaged before the tornado dissipated just west of the confluence of the Ohoopee and Little Ohoopee rivers.						
EF4	Pembroke to SE of Blitchton	Bryan	GA	32.1202°N 81.6561°W	21:18–21:33	14.39 mi (23.16 km)	1,300 yd (1,200 m)
EF4	1 death – See article on this tornado – Twelve people were injured.						
EF1	Swainsboro	Emanuel	GA	32.5482°N 82.4197°W	21:22–21:27	6.23 mi (10.03 km)	150 yd (140 m)
EF1	Several businesses in town had a large amount of tin roofing blown off and into streets, a few signs were blown down, and numerous trees were snapped or uprooted.						
EF0	NNE of Wesley	Emanuel	GA	32.5211°N 82.3086°W	21:27–21:28	0.7 mi (1.1 km)	50 yd (46 m)
EF0	A brief tornado caused minor roof damage to a home and snapped a few trees.						
EF2	SE of Batesburg-Leesville	Aiken, Lexington	SC	33.7910°N 81.4923°W	21:35–21:47	5.68 mi (9.14 km)	100 yd (91 m)
EF2	A significant tornado caused damage to three homes, including a frame home that lost a portion of its metal roof, and another home that was pushed partially off its foundation, causing some of the supporting piers to collapse and causing the house to buckle along its side and rear walls. One injury occurred inside as the roof partially collapsed. A third home had some of its wooden siding torn off, while power lines were downed, numerous large trees were snapped or uprooted, and a small metal shed was destroyed. A rusted antique car was moved about 50 feet (15 m), while an adjacent car engine was tossed about 35 feet (11 m).						
EF3	Northwestern Ulmer to NW of Bowman	Allendale, Bamberg, Orangeburg	SC	33.0993°N 81.218°W	22:03–22:53	34.49 mi (55.51 km)	500 yd (460 m)
EF3	See section on this tornado.						
EF1	NNW of Ulmer	Allendale	SC	33.1124°N 81.2277°W	22:03–22:05	1.29 mi (2.08 km)	100 yd (91 m)
EF1	Trees were snapped and uprooted.						
EF0	Eastern Varnville	Hampton	SC	32.8435°N 81.0761°W	22:20–22:24	1.74 mi (2.80 km)	250 yd (230 m)
EF0	A weak tornado impacted the eastern edge of Varnville, snapping and uprooting several trees. A home sustained minor roof damage, utility trailers were overturned, and a small grain bin was thrown.						
EF1	Gaston to NW of Sandy Run	Lexington, Calhoun	SC	33.8261°N 81.0973°W	22:20–22:29	5.85 mi (9.41 km)	40 yd (37 m)
EF1	The tornado touched down in Gaston, where a highway speed sign was damaged and tree branches were snapped. Numerous trees were snapped or uprooted elsewhere along the path, and a few outbuildings were damaged.						
EF0	E of St. George to E of Harleyville	Dorchester	SC	33.169°N 80.5188°W	23:12–23:19	5.6 mi (9.0 km)	50 yd (46 m)
EF0	Trees were downed sporadically by this weak tornado.						
EF2	Manning	Clarendon	SC	33.6907°N 80.2292°W	23:38–23:42	2.76 mi (4.44 km)	140 yd (130 m)
EF2	Beginning in the western part of Manning, this low-end EF2 tornado peeled back a large portion of the roof of a building, destroyed a playset, and bent a metal basketball hoop post. It moved through the northwestern part of town, impacting a Walmart, where a truck in the parking lot was flipped, two rooftop HVAC units were shifted approximately 15 feet (4.6 m), and roof trusses were bent. Several homes sustained mostly minor roof damage, although a few homes had more extensive damage. One well-built home sustained destruction of its attached garage, with the walls blown out and roof torn off, which had been attached with hurricane clips. Two parked vehicles were shifted several feet, and another home had considerable damage to its siding, windows, and garage doors. The tornado overturned a trailer at a business before dissipating. Numerous trees were downed along the path, including some large hardwood trees that were snapped.						
EF1	NE of Brittons Neck	Marion, Horry	SC	33.8947°N 79.3035°W	23:51–23:57	5.4 mi (8.7 km)	50 yd (46 m)
EF1	Several homes and other buildings sustained minor damage, part of a shed roof was blown off into a vehicle, and several trees were downed.						

=== April 6 event ===
List of confirmed tornadoes – Wednesday, April 6, 2022
EF#	Location	County / Parish	State	Start Coord.	Time (UTC)	Path length	Max width
EF1	ESE of Leslie	Lee, Sumter	GA	31.8932°N 84.0132°W	19:29–19:38	3.36 mi (5.41 km)	100 yd (91 m)
EF1	This tornado was caught on video by multiple storm chasers. Numerous trees were downed, and homes sustained roof damage south of Cobb.						
EF0	Palm Beach Gardens	Palm Beach	FL	26.8307°N 80.1042°W	21:23–21:31	0.55 mi (0.89 km)	100 yd (91 m)
EF0	Mostly trees and tree limbs were damaged, although more isolated damage to light poles, awnings, and buildings also occurred. A 78 mph (126 km/h) wind gust was reported at Palm Beach Gardens Community High School as the tornado passed in front of the school, and a soccer goal at the school was thrown 100–150 yards (91–137 m).						
EF0	SE of Quitman to SW of Valdosta	Brooks, Lowndes	GA	30.6943°N 83.5056°W	23:14–23:40	11.12 mi (17.90 km)	200 yd (180 m)
EF0	Trees were snapped or uprooted along the path.						
EF1	W of Cochran to SW of Chester	Bleckley, Dodge	GA	32.3883°N 83.3783°W	23:39–23:55	11.39 mi (18.33 km)	150 yd (140 m)
EF1	In Cochran, several homes and commercial buildings sustained roof damage, along with a building at Middle Georgia State University. Numerous trees were snapped or uprooted as well, some which caused additional damage to homes. East of Cochran, the path became intermittent before the tornado dissipated completely. Near the endpoint of the path, the tornado crossed the path of another tornado in Dodge County from the previous day.						
EF0	S of Allentown	Twiggs, Bleckley, Laurens	GA	32.5750°N 83.2443°W	23:45–23:49	3.62 mi (5.83 km)	100 yd (91 m)
EF0	This tornado touched down along the Twiggs–Bleckley County line and moved southeastward along I-16, where numerous trees were snapped or uprooted on either one side of the interstate or the other.						
EF1	SW of Dudley	Laurens	GA	32.4901°N 83.1557°W	23:52–23:58	4.9 mi (7.9 km)	150 yd (140 m)
EF1	A small shed was destroyed, a home sustained roof damage, two large grain bins were dented, and numerous trees were snapped or uprooted.						
EF1	SE of Chester to E of Cadwell	Dodge, Laurens	GA	32.3725°N 83.1406°W	23:53–00:11	16.36 mi (26.33 km)	200 yd (180 m)
EF1	Outbuildings sustained roof damage, a home's porch cover was destroyed, and numerous trees were downed, a couple of which fell on and damaged houses.						
EF1	NNE of Adrian to Swainsboro	Emanuel	GA	32.5532°N 82.573°W	00:22–00:39	15.8 mi (25.4 km)	500 yd (460 m)
EF1	Over 100 trees were snapped or uprooted, a few of which landed on homes, power poles and lines were downed, and a 24 foot (7.3 m) camper was rolled over and destroyed. This was the second EF1 tornado to strike Swainsboro in two days.						
EF1	Kite	Johnson, Emanuel	GA	32.6714°N 82.5734°W	00:22–00:33	8.41 mi (13.53 km)	500 yd (460 m)
EF1	This tornado began just southwest of Kite before moving directly through town and dissipating to the northeast in Emanuel County. Southwest of Kite, a carport was ripped away from a brick home, which lost a third of its roof, a stop sign was bent over, and power poles were snapped. In Kite, 20 to 30 homes sustained considerable damage, mostly to roofs. Numerous outbuildings were destroyed, and the concession building, fencing, and stands at a baseball field sustained heavy damage. At a cemetery, three 500-pound (230 kg) granite stones were lifted and flipped over. Two large barns and a few other outbuildings were destroyed before the tornado dissipated. Hundreds of trees were snapped or uprooted along the path.						
EF1	SSW of Barwick to SW of Barney	Thomas, Brooks	GA	30.8722°N 83.7478°W	01:12–01:23	7.92 mi (12.75 km)	300 yd (270 m)
EF1	Barns and outbuildings were heavily damaged or destroyed, homes were damaged, and trees and power lines were downed.						
EF0	WNW of Walterboro	Colleton	SC	32.9187°N 80.7411°W	02:59-03:02	1.02 mi (1.64 km)	100 yd (91 m)
EF0	A brief tornado snapped and uprooted a few trees and destroyed a fence.						
EFU	NW of Norman Park	Colquitt, Worth, Tift	GA	31.3122°N 83.797°W	03:17–03:34	10.64 mi (17.12 km)	25 yd (23 m)
EFU	The tornado was confirmed via photo and video traveling along the Colquitt–Worth county line and into Tift County. Only a few trees were downed, as the tornado remained over farmland and unpopulated areas.						
EF1	Southern Thomasville	Thomas	GA	30.8135°N 83.9951°W	03:36–03:39	1.65 mi (2.66 km)	200 yd (180 m)
EF1	A large concrete wall at a baseball field used by Thomas University was blown down, and homes sustained minor roof damage. Many trees were downed, including one that fell on a house near the end of the path.						

=== April 7 event ===
List of confirmed tornadoes – Thursday, April 7, 2022
EF#	Location	County / Parish	State	Start Coord.	Time (UTC)	Path length	Max width
EF1	SE of Boulogne	Nassau	FL	30.7515°N 81.9637°W	06:31–06:38	3.22 mi (5.18 km)	30 yd (27 m)
EF1	A tornado touched down along the concurrent US 1/US 301/US 23 and moved east-northeastward. It partially tore the metal roof off of a mobile home, throwing it about 20 yd (18 m), and downed trees and power lines.						
EF1	SE of Rebecca	Turner	GA	31.7962°N 83.4726°W	09:50–09:51	0.25 mi (0.40 km)	75 yd (69 m)
EF1	Several chicken houses were significantly damaged by a brief tornado.						

== See also ==
- Weather of 2022
- List of North American tornadoes and tornado outbreaks
- Tornadoes of 2022
  - List of United States tornadoes in April 2022
- Lists of tornadoes and tornado outbreaks
