= List of United States tornadoes in April 2022 =

United States tornadoes in April 2022
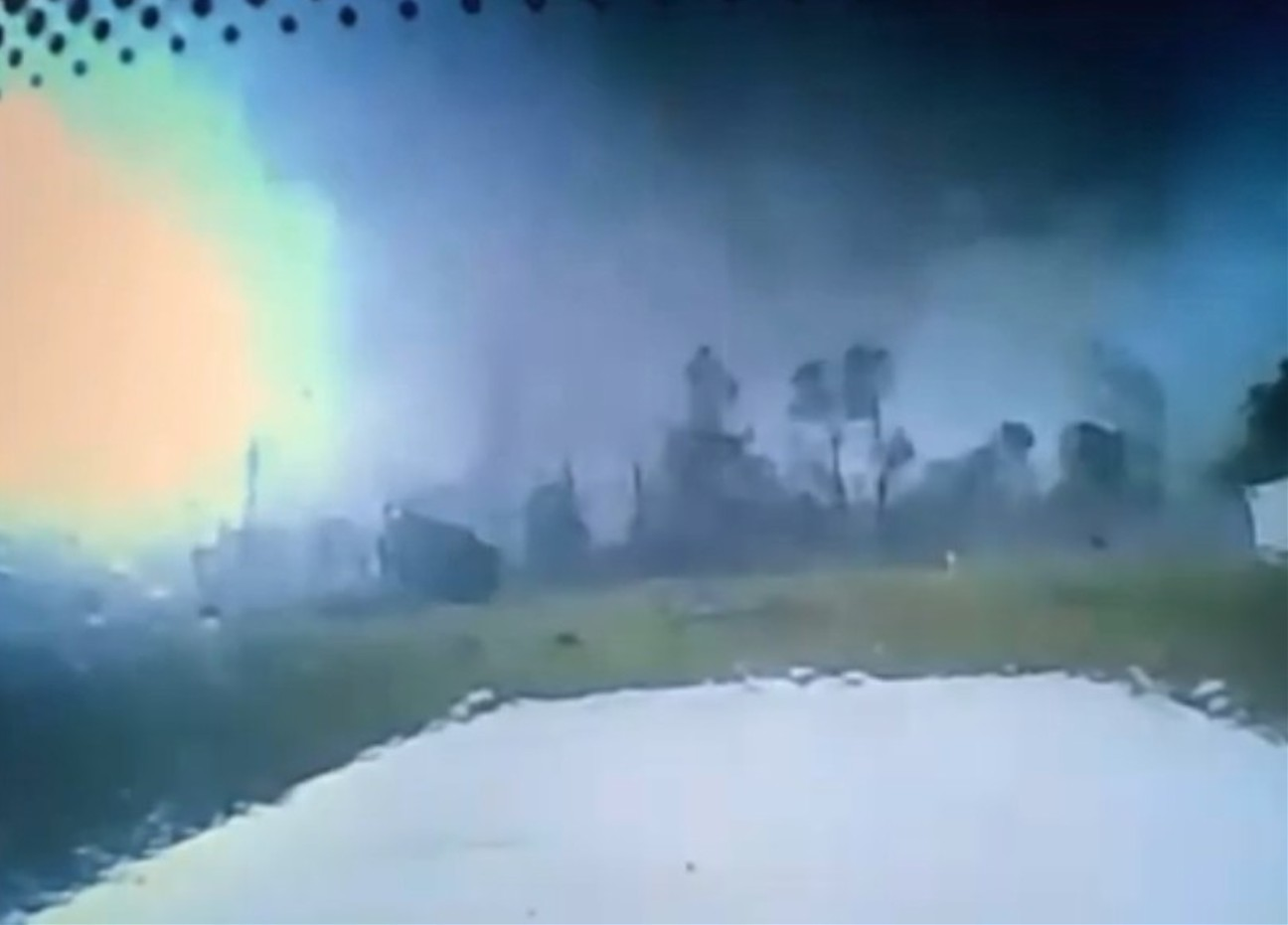
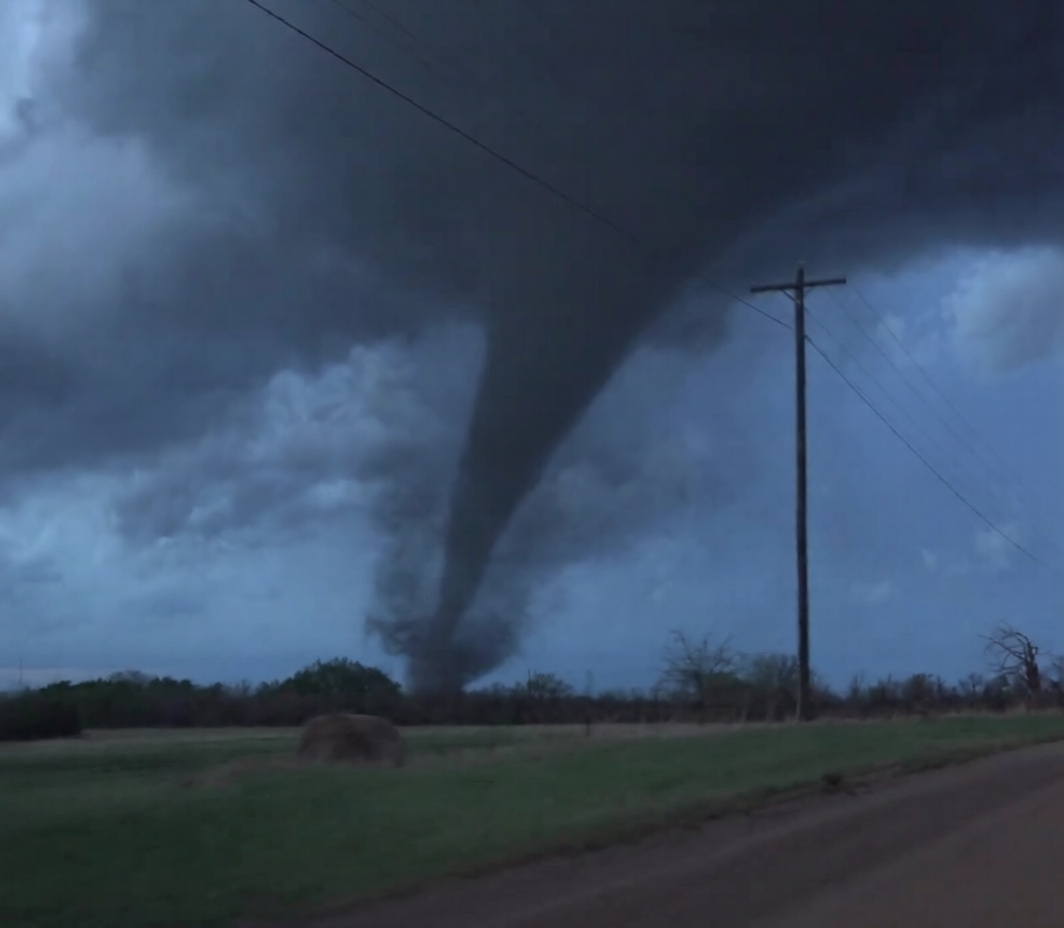
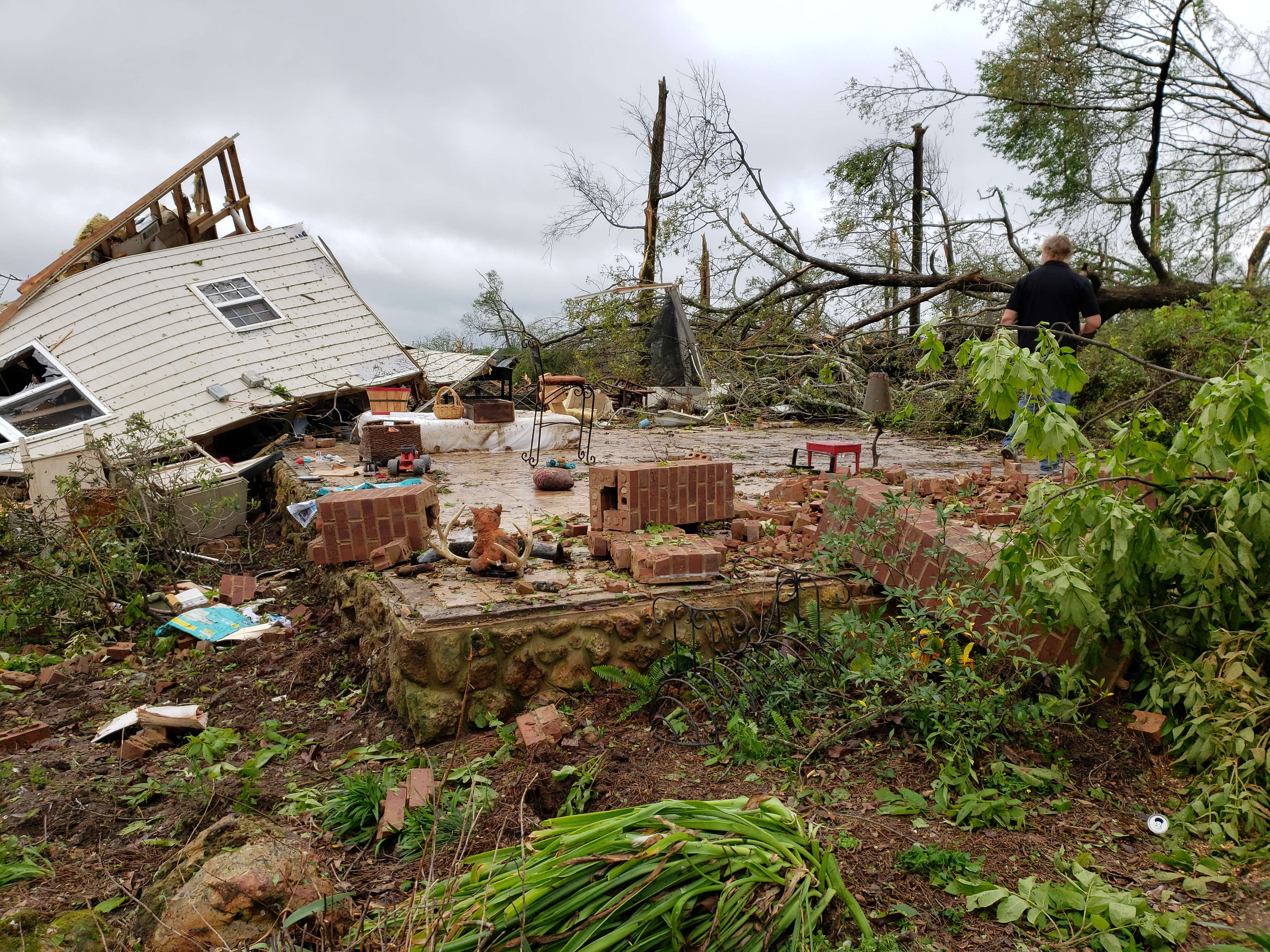
- Clockwise from top: An EF4 tornado as it struck Pembroke, Georgia on April 5; A home in Bonaire, Georgia following an EF3 tornado on April 5; An intense EF3 tornado in Andover, Kansas on April 29.
- Timespan: April 4 – April 30
- Maximum rated tornado: EF4 tornado: Pembroke, Georgia on April 5
- Tornadoes: 221
- Fatalities: 1
- Injuries: 50

This page documents all tornadoes confirmed by various weather forecast offices of the National Weather Service in the United States from April 2022. On average, there are 155 confirmed tornadoes in the United States in April. Activity also tends to spread northward and westward in April compared to the cooler winter months and the Midwest and Great Plains tend to see increased activity, although the relative maxima remain in the southern states.

Similar to the previous month, several sizeable tornado outbreaks occurred during April, especially at the beginning of the month from outbreaks that produced 89 and 74. The 163 tornadoes that these outbreaks produced by April 13 were about the average typically seen during the entire month. April would finish significantly above average with 221 tornadoes.

== United States yearly total ==
Confirmed tornadoes by Enhanced Fujita rating
EFU	EF0	EF1	EF2	EF3	EF4	EF5	Total
157	406	466	123	20	4	0	1,176

== April ==
Confirmed tornadoes by Enhanced Fujita rating
EFU	EF0	EF1	EF2	EF3	EF4	EF5	Total
20	73	105	17	5	1	0	221

=== April 4 event ===
List of confirmed tornadoes – Monday, April 4, 2022 (Note: All dates are based on the local time zone where the tornado touched down; however, all times are in Coordinated Universal Time for consistency.)
EF#	Location	County / Parish	State	Start Coord.	Time (UTC)	Path length	Max width	Summary
EF0	E of Wauchula	Hardee	FL		23:46–23:47	0.25 mi (0.40 km)	25 yd (23 m)	Law enforcement relayed video of a small, short-lived rope tornado. Power lines were reported down in the area.
EF1	Blue Ridge	Collin	TX		02:32–02:36	0.28 mi (0.45 km)	188 yd (172 m)	A brief tornado ripped a large section of metal roofing from two small workshop and farm outbuildings. Wooden roof panels were ripped from a small barn, and the walls of another metal outbuilding were collapsed. Multiple homes in Blue Ridge sustained roof damage, including one that suffered severe damage to its roof and roof decking. The metal roof canopy of a car wash and a few trees were damaged as well.
EF2	NW of Joshua to E of Egan	Johnson	TX		03:41–03:54	9.72 mi (15.64 km)	150 yd (140 m)	This tornado moved through both Joshua and Egan, with the most significant damage occurring in the latter community. One home near Egan sustained heavy damage, losing most of its roof, and a few manufactured homes were damaged, along with several metal buildings at a business. Many trees were downed as well. One person was injured.
EF0	N of Keene	Johnson	TX		03:49–03:53	1.68 mi (2.70 km)	75 yd (69 m)	A small tornado downed trees and caused minor roof damage.
EF0	N of Alvarado	Johnson	TX		03:58–04:06	4.87 mi (7.84 km)	200 yd (180 m)	Roofs, outbuildings, animal homes, and trees all sustained minor damage.
EF0	N of Venus	Johnson	TX		04:06–04:10	2.82 mi (4.54 km)	50 yd (46 m)	A tornado damaged the roofs and awnings of two residences, along with nearby outbuildings. Trees were downed as well.
EF0	WSW of Midlothian	Ellis	TX		04:13–04:15	1.44 mi (2.32 km)	30 yd (27 m)	Homes sustained roof damaged, and trees were downed.

=== April 5 event ===
List of confirmed tornadoes – Tuesday, April 5, 2022
EF#	Location	County / Parish	State	Start Coord.	Time (UTC)	Path length	Max width	Summary
EF1	NW of Downsville	Lincoln, Union	LA		08:45–08:49	5.09 mi (8.19 km)	150 yd (140 m)	Tin roofing was torn off a metal barn, and numerous trees were downed.
EF1	S of Pulaski	Scott	MS		11:46–11:57	7.59 mi (12.21 km)	100 yd (91 m)	Numerous trees were downed in the Bienville National Forest, with a couple falling on a carport and an RV.
EF1	SSE of Forest	Scott	MS		12:00–12:06	4.67 mi (7.52 km)	300 yd (270 m)	Numerous trees and several power lines were downed in the Bienville National Forest, and outbuildings sustained roof damage.
EF1	N of Prentiss	Jefferson Davis	MS		12:06–12:10	3.06 mi (4.92 km)	100 yd (91 m)	A majority of the metal roofing was ripped from a manufactured home and a small shed, and another manufactured home suffered partial roof removal. Numerous trees were snapped or uprooted as well.
EF1	S of Lake	Scott, Newton	MS		12:09–12:12	2.14 mi (3.44 km)	100 yd (91 m)	Doors on a farm building were damaged, and several trees were downed.
EF2	NNE of Prentiss to NW of Collins	Jefferson Davis, Covington	MS		12:09–12:26	14.76 mi (23.75 km)	400 yd (370 m)	One home lost a portion of its roof and its porch awning, while a nearby detached structure sustained significant roof damage, with debris strewn into a nearby field. Power poles and numerous large trees were snapped or uprooted, and one tree fell onto a mobile home. Several other homes, mobile homes, and a barn sustained roof and siding damage.
EF1	Lawrence to Newton	Newton	MS		12:16–12:21	4.03 mi (6.49 km)	100 yd (91 m)	This tornado touched down in Lawrence, where a shed was damaged, and trees were downed. Between Lawrence and Newton, more trees were downed, a shed was destroyed, and another building was heavily damaged. A home sustained roof damage, and a fence was damaged in Newton before the tornado dissipated.
EF1	NW of Collins to NW of Ellisville	Covington, Jones	MS		12:22–12:42	16.52 mi (26.59 km)	440 yd (400 m)	A couple homes sustained significant roof damage, and trees were downed.
EF1	SE of Ellisville to WSW of Strengthford	Jones	MS		12:56–13:07	8.56 mi (13.78 km)	250 yd (230 m)	A shed and a metal barn were damaged, power lines were downed, and numerous trees were snapped or uprooted before the tornado dissipated in the De Soto National Forest.
EF1	NW of Shubuta	Clarke	MS		13:06–13:09	2.87 mi (4.62 km)	250 yd (230 m)	A partially-built house was collapsed, the roof of a manufactured home was damaged, one shed was demolished, and a second shed was blown away. Another house had tin roofing peeled off, and a utility pole fell onto another home. Trees were snapped or uprooted as well.
EF2	S of Whistler	Wayne	MS		13:14–13:18	2.21 mi (3.56 km)	250 yd (230 m)	A strong tornado caused significant deforestation in a wooded area, with numerous large trees snapped near their bases.
EF0	Whynot	Lauderdale	MS		13:18–13:22	2.55 mi (4.10 km)	25 yd (23 m)	Numerous trees were snapped or uprooted.
EF1	SE of Whistler	Wayne	MS		13:19–13:22	2.56 mi (4.12 km)	100 yd (91 m)	Numerous trees were snapped or uprooted, including by a potential satellite tornado. A couple homes sustained minor roof damage. A carport was lofted about 40 ft (12 m) into a tree.
EF1	N of Denham	Wayne	MS		13:36–13:37	0.29 mi (0.47 km)	50 yd (46 m)	A brief tornado snapped or uprooted numerous trees, several of which fell on a home and caused damage.
EF2	NNE of Bladon Springs to W of McEntyre	Choctaw, Clarke	AL		14:03–14:14	9.46 mi (15.22 km)	800 yd (730 m)	A large multiple-vortex tornado mowed down countless trees in forested areas, in addition to inflicting minor to moderate roof damage to homes. In November 2023, this tornado was reanalyzed and had its width adjusted due to an additional area of snapped trees noted on Worldview satellite imagery.
EF1	NNE of Coffeeville	Clarke	AL		14:10–14:13	1.83 mi (2.95 km)	100 yd (91 m)	A brief satellite tornado moved around the southern periphery of the previous EF2 tornado. It snapped or uprooted trees and ripped significant portions of roofing and siding from a barn.
EF1	E of Beatrice	Monroe	AL		15:10–15:13	1.52 mi (2.45 km)	75 yd (69 m)	Numerous trees were snapped or uprooted.
EF2	E of Wetumpka	Elmore	AL		15:54–16:00	4.36 mi (7.02 km)	900 yd (820 m)	Significant tree damage was observed in a forested area, where a large swath of trees was completely flattened.
EF2	N of Petrey (1st tornado)	Crenshaw	AL		15:56–15:59	1.34 mi (2.16 km)	250 yd (230 m)	A brief but strong tornado snapped a large swath of trees and destroyed a chicken house. The roof of a church was damaged as well.
EF2	NE of Petrey to SE of Pine Level	Pike, Montgomery	AL		16:03–16:18	12.68 mi (20.41 km)	1,100 yd (1,000 m)	Numerous trees were snapped or uprooted by this large tornado, including one that fell on a house, and some other homes suffered minor roof damage. A manufactured home was shifted off its foundation, a guyed transmission tower was toppled, and a metal barn was destroyed as well.
EF0	SE of Eclectic to Burlington	Elmore	AL		16:06–16:13	5.31 mi (8.55 km)	300 yd (270 m)	Numerous trees were downed, some of which caused structural damage. A few homes sustained minor roof, soffit, and fascia damage directly from winds, and a carport was blown off a home before the tornado dissipated in Burlington.
EF1	N of Franklin	Macon	AL		16:19–16:24	4.35 mi (7.00 km)	250 yd (230 m)	Numerous trees were snapped or uprooted.
EFU	N of Petrey (2nd tornado)	Crenshaw	AL		16:20–16:21	0.43 mi (0.69 km)	25 yd (23 m)	A tornado touched down near the starting point of the first Petrey tornado, making the damage indistinguishable from the earlier tornado. The tornado was confirmed via data from the NOAA PERiLs field campaign, sentinel satellite imagery, and third-party pressure data. The path width, path length, and specific damage were inconclusive, and no rating could be determined.
EF0	NNE of Tallassee	Tallapoosa	AL		16:22–16:25	1.75 mi (2.82 km)	110 yd (100 m)	Several trees were downed, a few of which resulted in structural damage.
EF1	N of Orion to ESE of China Grove	Montgomery, Pike	AL		16:34–16:45	7.56 mi (12.17 km)	550 yd (500 m)	A few homes sustained minor roof and siding damage, and numerous trees were snapped or uprooted.
EF0	WSW of Lafayette	Chambers	AL		16:45–16:46	0.44 mi (0.71 km)	200 yd (180 m)	An outbuilding was damaged, and a few trees were snapped or uprooted.
EF1	SW of Union Springs	Bullock	AL		16:50–16:52	1.58 mi (2.54 km)	600 yd (550 m)	Numerous trees were snapped or uprooted.
EF1	N of Eufaula	Barbour	AL		17:38–17:40	1.54 mi (2.48 km)	200 yd (180 m)	A tornado moved through forested land, snapping or uprooted trees. One large tree fell on a house, rendering it uninhabitable.
EF1	NNE of Cusseta	Chattahoochee	GA		18:04–18:09	6.72 mi (10.81 km)	300 yd (270 m)	A tornado began on the east side of Fort Benning, snapping or uprooting trees.
EF0	NW of Headland	Henry	AL		18:24-18:27	2.77 mi (4.46 km)	50 yd (46 m)	A few trees were downed.
EF1	N of Mauk	Taylor	GA		18:29–18:35	3.04 mi (4.89 km)	150 yd (140 m)	Trees were snapped or uprooted, a chicken house was almost completely destroyed, a barn was completely collapsed, and homes were damaged by either winds damaging the roof or trees falling on them. A narrow path of intense ground scouring was found in an open field, where large clumps of grass and sod were pulled up.
EF0	W of Malvern to Rehobeth	Geneva, Houston	AL		18:38–18:47	6.84 mi (11.01 km)	200 yd (180 m)	A weak tornado moved through Malvern, displacing the stairway of one home about 5 ft (1.5 m) and removing roof material from an adjacent manufactured home. The wall of another manufactured home was impaled by a wooden projectile. A few outbuildings were damaged and large trees were snapped or uprooted, two of which fell onto homes.
EF1	N of Malvern	Geneva	AL		18:39–18:40	0.19 mi (0.31 km)	50 yd (46 m)	This very brief tornado touched down in a field and caused crop damage. It then destroyed a well-built carport, pulling anchor bolts from concrete and lag bolts from wooden posts. The tornado occurred simultaneously with the previous tornado.
EF1	NE of Butler	Taylor	GA		18:50–18:59	7.20 mi (11.59 km)	300 yd (270 m)	The same storm that produced the first EF1 tornado in Taylor County cycled and produced this tornado. Trees were snapped or uprooted, and a mill sustained roof damage.
EF0	Cowarts	Houston	AL		18:53–18:54	0.07 mi (0.11 km)	25 yd (23 m)	This very brief tornado downed several trees in Cowarts, a couple of which fell onto the side of a home and on top of a car. A few outbuildings sustained roof damage as well.
EF1	Fountainville to NE of Montezuma	Macon	GA		19:01–19:24	17.33 mi (27.89 km)	250 yd (230 m)	Numerous trees were snapped or uprooted, and several buildings at the Whitewater Creek Park were damaged. A Tyson Foods plant and a nearby manufactured home both sustained minor damage, and a small outbuilding was destroyed.
EF1	SW of Roberta to ENE of Knoxville	Crawford	GA		19:07–19:19	8.83 mi (14.21 km)	200 yd (180 m)	Near the beginning of the path, two barns were destroyed, a third was severely damaged, and a house sustained significant roof and window damage. On the southwest side of Roberta, two other homes sustained roof and siding damage, a shed was flipped onto its roof, and a car was crushed by a falling tree. Elsewhere, several more homes sustained minor roof damage. Many trees were downed along the path.
EF1	S of Cuba	Early, Miller	GA		19:15–19:21	7.14 mi (11.49 km)	50 yd (46 m)	Numerous trees were snapped or uprooted, and a house sustained damage to its roof.
EF1	N of Cuba	Early	GA		19:15–19:21	4.94 mi (7.95 km)	50 yd (46 m)	Trees were snapped or uprooted, and a few homes sustained roof damage.
EF2	E of Byromville	Dooly	GA		19:26–19:33	5.8 mi (9.3 km)	300 yd (270 m)	Five large, anchored grain bins were destroyed, with 4-foot (1.2 m) concrete anchors being ripped out of the ground and a 6-inch (15 cm) steel beam attached to one of the anchors being bent. Some steel paneling from the bins was thrown up to a half mile away. A mesonet station run by the University of Georgia was hit by the tornado, damaging the station. However, the station continued to measure wind and pressure readings, recording a wind gust of 129.3 mph (208.1 km/h). Adjacent to the station, a semi-trailer was ripped from its rig and thrown 30 feet (9.1 m). Further to the east, at least six irrigation towers were rolled, and a few barns and outbuildings were destroyed. A house sustained roof damage before the tornado dissipated just northwest of Pinehurst. Many trees were snapped or uprooted along the path.
EF1	Northwestern Macon	Bibb	GA		19:33–19:36	2.02 mi (3.25 km)	150 yd (140 m)	A brief tornado touched down north of Payne in the northwestern part of Macon. A church steeple was heavily damaged, several houses sustained mostly minor roof damage, and trees were snapped or uprooted.
EF3	Bonaire	Houston	GA		19:49–19:56	3.89 mi (6.26 km)	820 yd (750 m)	Two large high-tension electrical transmission towers were destroyed, and a large concrete power pole was snapped near the base by this high-end EF3 tornado. Multiple homes in Bonaire were significantly damaged, with one being completely destroyed and another losing large sections of its roof and second story. Other homes sustained minor to moderate damage, and numerous large trees were snapped or uprooted as well. One person sustained minor injuries.
EF3	SW of Allendale to NE of Sycamore	Allendale	SC		19:50–20:10	13.28 mi (21.37 km)	1,000 yd (910 m)	A low-end EF3 wedge tornado, which prompted the issuance of a tornado emergency, touched down southwest of Allendale and moved through rural areas towards town, quickly reaching peak intensity and obliterating a couple of anchored mobile homes, scattering their debris across fields and into trees. The metal frame of one of the mobile homes was thrown a considerable distance and one person was injured in this area. The tornado then weakened but remained strong as continued to move northeastward, snapping trees and downing power lines. As it crossed US 278 at the southeast edge of Allendale, it destroyed a block and steel-construction warehouse and knocked over a large fiberglass tank. The tornado then weakened further as it moved through Sycamore, downing trees, causing minor structural damage, and overturning a pivot irrigation sprinkler before dissipating to the northeast of town. Numerous large trees were snapped and denuded along the path, and power poles were snapped as well.
EF0	N of Newton	Baker	GA		19:51-19:52	0.64 mi (1.03 km)	25 yd (23 m)	A trained spotter reported a tornado with trees snapped in the area.
EF0	WNW of Milledgeville	Baldwin	GA		20:01–20:03	1.69 mi (2.72 km)	150 yd (140 m)	Over 100 trees were snapped or uprooted.
EF1	S of Jeffersonville to NW of Nicklesville	Twiggs, Wilkinson	GA		20:11–20:22	12.35 mi (19.88 km)	400 yd (370 m)	A high-end EF1 tornado caused significant damage to several homes, including one that had its attached garage destroyed, and another that sustained collapse of its chimney and roof, with a significant amount of it roof covering removed. A manufactured home was also shifted and heavily damaged, and many trees were snapped or uprooted along the path.
EF1	NW of Sale City	Mitchell, Colquitt	GA		20:12–20:19	8.1 mi (13.0 km)	50 yd (46 m)	A tornado uplifted and destroyed a carport, moved a small house off its foundation, and snapped or uprooted many trees.
EF1	SE of Cochran to SW of Chester	Bleckley, Dodge	GA		20:14–20:23	7.62 mi (12.26 km)	125 yd (114 m)	The second story of a frail home was removed, another home sustained roof and carport damage, and several trees were snapped or uprooted.
EF1	W of Ehrhardt	Bamberg	SC		20:18–20:27	3.73 mi (6.00 km)	250 yd (230 m)	A tornado destroyed a shed, blew the roof and walls off another shed, and removed a portion of the tin roof from a house. Multiple vehicles and a small tractor were spun and shifted, shingles and siding were ripped off of a second house, and many large trees were snapped or uprooted.
EF0	S of Abbeville	Wilcox, Dodge	GA		20:20–20:29	9.38 mi (15.10 km)	200 yd (180 m)	One manufactured home was destroyed and another was overturned. Multiple trees were snapped or uprooted. Multiple campers at a hunting camp were damaged or destroyed. Numerous trees were uprooted, some of which fell on buildings.
EF1	N of Chester	Bleckley, Laurens	GA		20:30–20:33	1.78 mi (2.86 km)	250 yd (230 m)	Hundreds of trees were snapped or uprooted. This tornado formed shortly after the Bleckley/Dodge County EF1 tornado dissipated.
EF0	NE of Ehrhardt	Bamberg	SC		20:39–20:41	2.35 mi (3.78 km)	200 yd (180 m)	Trees were downed sporadically along the path.
EF0	E of Branchville	Orangeburg	SC		20:53–20:55	0.99 mi (1.59 km)	50 yd (46 m)	A brief tornado touched down on the athletic fields adjacent to Branchville High School, removing the metal roof from an equipment shed, ripping fencing from the baseball field backstop, and displacing bleachers. Portions of a roof were ripped from a structure as well.
EF0	SW of Bowman	Orangeburg	SC		21:07–21:09	0.76 mi (1.22 km)	200 yd (180 m)	A farm equipment storage barn had portions of its tin exterior removed. An unanchored helicopter was shifted more than 90 degrees, and six acres of panels were damaged at a solar farm.
EF0	NNE of Soperton	Treutlen	GA		21:10–21:13	0.88 mi (1.42 km)	100 yd (91 m)	Several trees were snapped or uprooted.
EF1	NE of Soperton	Treutlen	GA		21:17–21:18	0.78 mi (1.26 km)	200 yd (180 m)	Several barns and outbuildings were destroyed as a result of this high-end EF1 tornado, and two homes were damaged, both of which had their carports torn off, which resulted in partial roof loss. Sheet metal debris from structures was scattered for hundreds of yards. A double-wide mobile home was moved off its foundation and had significant siding and shingle loss, and over 100 trees were snapped or uprooted. More outbuildings were damaged before the tornado dissipated just west of the confluence of the Ohoopee and Little Ohoopee rivers.
EF4	Pembroke to SE of Blitchton	Bryan	GA		21:18–21:33	14.39 mi (23.16 km)	1,300 yd (1,200 m)	1 death – See article on this tornado – Twelve people were injured.
EF1	Swainsboro	Emanuel	GA		21:22–21:27	6.23 mi (10.03 km)	150 yd (140 m)	Several businesses in town had a large amount of tin roofing blown off and into streets, a few signs were blown down, and numerous trees were snapped or uprooted.
EF0	NNE of Wesley	Emanuel	GA		21:27–21:28	0.7 mi (1.1 km)	50 yd (46 m)	A brief tornado caused minor roof damage to a home and snapped a few trees.
EF2	SE of Batesburg-Leesville	Aiken, Lexington	SC		21:35–21:47	5.68 mi (9.14 km)	100 yd (91 m)	A significant tornado caused damage to three homes, including a frame home that lost a portion of its metal roof, and another home that was pushed partially off its foundation, causing some of the supporting piers to collapse and causing the house to buckle along its side and rear walls. One injury occurred inside as the roof partially collapsed. A third home had some of its wooden siding torn off, while power lines were downed, numerous large trees were snapped or uprooted, and a small metal shed was destroyed. A rusted antique car was moved about 50 feet (15 m), while an adjacent car engine was tossed about 35 feet (11 m).
EF3	Northwestern Ulmer to NW of Bowman	Allendale, Bamberg, Orangeburg	SC		22:03–22:53	34.49 mi (55.51 km)	500 yd (460 m)	This strong tornado touched down on a farm at the northwestern edge of Ulmer, throwing a grain silo, flipping or tossing farm vehicles and equipment, and downing trees. As the tornado moved northeastward away from Ulmer, it rapidly intensified, causing massive tree damage. Large areas of forest were completely mowed down, with some debarking noted and every tree in the direct path being snapped at the base in the worst affected areas. High-end EF3 vegetation damage occurred along the edge of a pond, where extensive ground scouring was observed, while low-lying shrubbery and small trees were completely shredded and debarked. The tornado weakened some but remained strong as it moved through rural areas to the east of US 301, where a mobile home was completely destroyed, and a frame home was unroofed and sustained partial collapse of exterior walls. Several other homes and mobile homes sustained less severe roof, siding, and window damage in this area as well. A few outbuildings were destroyed, and a large metal grain silo was thrown 150 yards (140 m). The tornado weakened further as passed to the southeast of Bamberg, causing minor to moderate tree damage and overturning some irrigation pivot sprinklers as it continued to the northeast before lifting near the town of Bowman.
EF1	NNW of Ulmer	Allendale	SC		22:03–22:05	1.29 mi (2.08 km)	100 yd (91 m)	Trees were snapped and uprooted.
EF0	Eastern Varnville	Hampton	SC		22:20–22:24	1.74 mi (2.80 km)	250 yd (230 m)	A weak tornado impacted the eastern edge of Varnville, snapping and uprooting several trees. A home sustained minor roof damage, utility trailers were overturned, and a small grain bin was thrown.
EF1	Gaston to NW of Sandy Run	Lexington, Calhoun	SC		22:20–22:29	5.85 mi (9.41 km)	40 yd (37 m)	The tornado touched down in Gaston, where a highway speed sign was damaged and tree branches were snapped. Numerous trees were snapped or uprooted elsewhere along the path, and a few outbuildings were damaged.
EF0	E of St. George to E of Harleyville	Dorchester	SC		23:12–23:19	5.6 mi (9.0 km)	50 yd (46 m)	Trees were downed sporadically by this weak tornado.
EF2	Manning	Clarendon	SC		23:38–23:42	2.76 mi (4.44 km)	140 yd (130 m)	Beginning in the western part of Manning, this low-end EF2 tornado peeled back a large portion of the roof of a building, destroyed a playset, and bent a metal basketball hoop post. It moved through the northwestern part of town, impacting a Walmart, where a truck in the parking lot was flipped, two rooftop HVAC units were shifted approximately 15 feet (4.6 m), and roof trusses were bent. Several homes sustained mostly minor roof damage, although a few homes had more extensive damage. One well-built home sustained destruction of its attached garage, with the walls blown out and roof torn off, which had been attached with hurricane clips. Two parked vehicles were shifted several feet, and another home had considerable damage to its siding, windows, and garage doors. The tornado overturned a trailer at a business before dissipating. Numerous trees were downed along the path, including some large hardwood trees that were snapped.
EF1	NE of Brittons Neck	Marion, Horry	SC		23:51–23:57	5.4 mi (8.7 km)	50 yd (46 m)	Several homes and other buildings sustained minor damage, part of a shed roof was blown off into a vehicle, and several trees were downed.

=== April 6 event ===
List of confirmed tornadoes – Wednesday, April 6, 2022
EF#	Location	County / Parish	State	Start Coord.	Time (UTC)	Path length	Max width	Summary
EF1	ESE of Leslie	Lee, Sumter	GA		19:29–19:38	3.36 mi (5.41 km)	100 yd (91 m)	This tornado was caught on video by multiple storm chasers. Numerous trees were downed, and homes sustained roof damage south of Cobb.
EF0	Palm Beach Gardens	Palm Beach	FL		21:23–21:31	0.55 mi (0.89 km)	100 yd (91 m)	Mostly trees and tree limbs were damaged, although more isolated damage to light poles, awnings, and buildings also occurred. A 78 mph (126 km/h) wind gust was reported at Palm Beach Gardens Community High School as the tornado passed in front of the school, and a soccer goal at the school was thrown 100–150 yards (91–137 m).
EF0	SE of Quitman to SW of Valdosta	Brooks, Lowndes	GA		23:14–23:40	11.12 mi (17.90 km)	200 yd (180 m)	Trees were snapped or uprooted along the path.
EF1	W of Cochran to SW of Chester	Bleckley, Dodge	GA		23:39–23:55	11.39 mi (18.33 km)	150 yd (140 m)	In Cochran, several homes and commercial buildings sustained roof damage, along with a building at Middle Georgia State University. Numerous trees were snapped or uprooted as well, some which caused additional damage to homes. East of Cochran, the path became intermittent before the tornado dissipated completely. Near the endpoint of the path, the tornado crossed the path of another tornado in Dodge County from the previous day.
EF0	S of Allentown	Twiggs, Bleckley, Laurens	GA		23:45–23:49	3.62 mi (5.83 km)	100 yd (91 m)	This tornado touched down along the Twiggs–Bleckley County line and moved southeastward along I-16, where numerous trees were snapped or uprooted on either one side of the interstate or the other.
EF1	SW of Dudley	Laurens	GA		23:52–23:58	4.9 mi (7.9 km)	150 yd (140 m)	A small shed was destroyed, a home sustained roof damage, two large grain bins were dented, and numerous trees were snapped or uprooted.
EF1	SE of Chester to E of Cadwell	Dodge, Laurens	GA		23:53–00:11	16.36 mi (26.33 km)	200 yd (180 m)	Outbuildings sustained roof damage, a home's porch cover was destroyed, and numerous trees were downed, a couple of which fell on and damaged houses.
EF1	NNE of Adrian to Swainsboro	Emanuel	GA		00:22–00:39	15.8 mi (25.4 km)	500 yd (460 m)	Over 100 trees were snapped or uprooted, a few of which landed on homes, power poles and lines were downed, and a 24 foot (7.3 m) camper was rolled over and destroyed. This was the second EF1 tornado to strike Swainsboro in two days.
EF1	Kite	Johnson, Emanuel	GA		00:22–00:33	8.41 mi (13.53 km)	500 yd (460 m)	This tornado began just southwest of Kite before moving directly through town and dissipating to the northeast in Emanuel County. Southwest of Kite, a carport was ripped away from a brick home, which lost a third of its roof, a stop sign was bent over, and power poles were snapped. In Kite, 20 to 30 homes sustained considerable damage, mostly to roofs. Numerous outbuildings were destroyed, and the concession building, fencing, and stands at a baseball field sustained heavy damage. At a cemetery, three 500-pound (230 kg) granite stones were lifted and flipped over. Two large barns and a few other outbuildings were destroyed before the tornado dissipated. Hundreds of trees were snapped or uprooted along the path.
EF1	SSW of Barwick to SW of Barney	Thomas, Brooks	GA		01:12–01:23	7.92 mi (12.75 km)	300 yd (270 m)	Barns and outbuildings were heavily damaged or destroyed, homes were damaged, and trees and power lines were downed.
EF0	WNW of Walterboro	Colleton	SC		02:59-03:02	1.02 mi (1.64 km)	100 yd (91 m)	A brief tornado snapped and uprooted a few trees and destroyed a fence.
EFU	NW of Norman Park	Colquitt, Worth, Tift	GA		03:17–03:34	10.64 mi (17.12 km)	25 yd (23 m)	The tornado was confirmed via photo and video traveling along the Colquitt–Worth county line and into Tift County. Only a few trees were downed, as the tornado remained over farmland and unpopulated areas.
EF1	Southern Thomasville	Thomas	GA		03:36–03:39	1.65 mi (2.66 km)	200 yd (180 m)	A large concrete wall at a baseball field used by Thomas University was blown down, and homes sustained minor roof damage. Many trees were downed, including one that fell on a house near the end of the path.

=== April 7 event ===
List of confirmed tornadoes – Thursday, April 7, 2022
EF#	Location	County / Parish	State	Start Coord.	Time (UTC)	Path length	Max width	Summary
EF1	SE of Boulogne	Nassau	FL		06:31–06:38	3.22 mi (5.18 km)	30 yd (27 m)	A tornado touched down along the concurrent US 1/US 301/US 23 and moved east-northeastward. It partially tore the metal roof off of a mobile home, throwing it about 20 yd (18 m), and downed trees and power lines.
EF1	SE of Rebecca	Turner	GA		09:50–09:51	0.25 mi (0.40 km)	75 yd (69 m)	Several chicken houses were significantly damaged by a brief tornado.

=== April 11 event ===
List of confirmed tornadoes – Monday, April 11, 2022
EF#	Location	County / Parish	State	Start Coord.	Time (UTC)	Path length	Max width	Summary
EF1	SSE of Bloomer	Sebastian	AR	35.276°N 94.134°W	22:12–22:13	1 mi (1.6 km)	140 yd (130 m)	Trees were uprooted, and large tree limbs were snapped in a heavily wooded area of Fort Chaffee.
EF1	SE of Charleston	Franklin	AR	35.280°N 94.038°W	22:23–22:32	2.4 mi (3.9 km)	200 yd (180 m)	A home and several outbuildings were damaged, and several trees were snapped or uprooted.
EF1	NE of Scranton	Logan	AR	35.36°N 93.51°W	23:33–23:44	3.38 mi (5.44 km)	100 yd (91 m)	A metal barn sustained significant damage, the roof of a mobile home was damaged, a small outbuilding was destroyed, and many trees were snapped or uprooted.
EFU	N of Talihina	LeFlore	OK	34.816°N 95.011°W	00:11–00:13	0.75 mi (1.21 km)	100 yd (91 m)	A brief tornado touched down over a rural area, causing no damage.
EF1	E of Mayflower to NNE of Gibson	Faulkner, Pulaski	AR	34.9551°N 92.3488°W	01:07–01:18	7.85 mi (12.63 km)	100 yd (91 m)	Many trees were downed at Camp Robinson and just north of the Cato community.

=== April 12 event ===
List of confirmed tornadoes – Tuesday, April 12, 2022
EF#	Location	County / Parish	State	Start Coord.	Time (UTC)	Path length	Max width	Summary
EFU	Fort Hood	Coryell	TX	31.3405°N 97.7778°W	22:06–22:15	3.89 mi (6.26 km)	50 yd (46 m)	Weather spotters confirmed a tornado over an inaccessible part of Fort Hood; the damage path was unable to be surveyed.
EF3	N of Florence to NW of Salado	Williamson, Bell	TX	30.8846°N 97.788°W	22:29–23:06	16.55 mi (26.63 km)	770 yd (700 m)	See section on this tornado – 23 people were injured.
EF2	NE of Palmer to W of Gilmore City	Pocahontas	IA	42.6492°N 94.5437°W	23:15–23:33	7.17 mi (11.54 km)	450 yd (410 m)	A large and strong tornado damaged farmsteads, destroyed outbuildings, and snapped power poles along its path.
EF1	E of Gilmore City to SSW of Rutland	Humboldt	IA	42.7158°N 94.3539°W	23:28–23:37	3.34 mi (5.38 km)	300 yd (270 m)	This tornado produced high-end EF1 damage to several farms along an unusual fish-hook shaped path. Trees were damaged as well.
EF1	NE of Monroe	Ouachita	LA	32.5619°N 91.9872°W	23:34–23:39	2.55 mi (4.10 km)	300 yd (270 m)	Numerous trees were damaged, including about 100 that were uprooted or snapped. Many of these trees landed on buildings and caused structural damage; one landed on a manufactured home and injured the occupant.
EF2	NW of Rutland to SSE of Bode	Humboldt	IA	42.7912°N 94.3335°W	23:39–23:50	4.85 mi (7.81 km)	250 yd (230 m)	A strong tornado snapped numerous power poles and caused considerable damage to farmsteads. The tornado moved along an unusual fish-hook shaped path, much like the previous EF1 tornado that occurred near Rutland.
EFU	SW of Goehner	Seward	NE	40.80°N 97.24°W	23:43	0.5 mi (0.80 km)	10 yd (9.1 m)	Video evidence as well as train spotter reports confirmed a brief, weak tornado over open terrain south of Interstate 80. The total path length is uncertain due to the lack of damage.
EF0	SSE of Seaton	Bell	TX	31.0408°N 97.217°W	00:25–00:31	3.73 mi (6.00 km)	120 yd (110 m)	A weak tornado that was observed by storm spotters downed several trees.
EF0	Kanawha	Hancock	IA	42.9334°N 93.8167°W	00:33–00:36	1.65 mi (2.66 km)	100 yd (91 m)	A brief, weak tornado caused minor damage in Kanawha.
EF1	SE of Missouri Valley to ESE of Logan	Harrison	IA	41.5351°N 95.8569°W	01:08–01:18	9.55 mi (15.37 km)	140 yd (130 m)	A tornado embedded within a larger area of damaging straight-line winds damaged trees, destroyed a few barns and sheds, and inflicted minor damage to a home.
EF1	Unadilla	Otoe	NE	40.6818°N 96.2706°W	01:24–01:25	0.09 mi (0.14 km)	40 yd (37 m)	A brief tornado caused damage to the roofs, siding, and gutters of three homes in town. Tree damage occurred as well.
EF1	ESE of Woodbine	Harrison	IA	41.71°N 95.69°W	01:25–01:28	2.30 mi (3.70 km)	200 yd (180 m)	Trees were damaged, a shed was destroyed, and other farm structures were damaged.
EF1	W of Benton	Caddo, Bossier	LA	32.6792°N 93.8091°W	02:54–02:57	4.31 mi (6.94 km)	200 yd (180 m)	A center pivot irrigation system was flipped, five metal farm or outbuildings had their roofs partially removed, and numerous trees were snapped or uprooted by this high-end EF1 tornado. A guest house was shifted off its foundation and destroyed. A nearby two-story single family home had a large portion of its roof removed, and a second home was also damaged.
EF0	Southern Shreveport to WSW of Haughton	Caddo, Bossier	LA	32.4197°N 93.7138°W	02:55–03:04	12 mi (19 km)	400 yd (370 m)	A weak tornado embedded within a larger area of damaging straight-line winds impacted the Louisiana State University Shreveport campus, downing trees and damaging the school's baseball and soccer fields. Elsewhere along the path, many trees were downed, including three that fell on and severely damaged mobile homes. Power poles and power lines were downed, a food stand was damaged, and several homes suffered minor shingle damage. The tornado crossed Barksdale Air Force Base, where more trees were downed and tree branches were broken, before dissipating.
EF0	N of Hosston	Caddo	LA	32.8992°N 93.8991°W	02:57–02:58	1.23 mi (1.98 km)	50 yd (46 m)	A weak tornado snapped tree limbs.
EF1	W of Castor to NW of Lucky	Bienville	LA	32.2493°N 93.2595°W	03:23–03:34	11.46 mi (18.44 km)	525 yd (480 m)	Numerous trees were snapped or uprooted along the path.
EF1	Southeastern Mason City	Cerro Gordo	IA	43.1113°N 93.2045°W	03:26–03:32	4.49 mi (7.23 km)	100 yd (91 m)	A tornado moved through the southeastern outskirts of Mason City, where several buildings damaged, including some that had their roofs blown off. An office building was heavily damaged as well.
EF1	S of Grafton	Worth	IA	43.2796°N 93.0667°W	03:34-03:36	1.19 mi (1.92 km)	70 yd (64 m)	A tornado caused damage to trees and an outbuilding at a farmstead.
EF0	S of Prescott	Nevada	AR	33.7813°N 93.3883°W	03:41–03:42	0.22 mi (0.35 km)	50 yd (46 m)	A number of trees were uprooted by this brief, weak tornado.
EF0	NW of Rudd	Floyd, Mitchell	IA	43.1572°N 92.9427°W	03:41–03:48	8.14 mi (13.10 km)	50 yd (46 m)	Satellite imagery revealed a tornado path through open farm fields.
EF2	Taopi	Mower	MN	43.5406°N 92.6601°W	03:46–03:52	3.93 mi (6.32 km)	475 yd (434 m)	A significant tornado caused severe damage as it passed directly through the small town of Taopi. Multiple homes sustained major structural damage, with roofs removed and walls collapsed, including one home that had multiple exterior walls knocked down. Outbuildings and barns were heavily damaged or destroyed, power poles were snapped, and many trees were downed. Cars were flipped, and debris was scattered throughout the town and deposited in trees. Two people were injured.
EF1	S of Brownville	Mitchell	IA	43.3244°N 92.7049°W	03:57–04:00	2.8 mi (4.5 km)	250 yd (230 m)	A tornado damaged trees and outbuildings.
EF1	E of New Haven to ESE of Riceville	Mitchell, Howard	IA	43.2574°N 92.6427°W	03:57–04:09	9.09 mi (14.63 km)	325 yd (297 m)	Numerous farm buildings and grain bins were damaged.
EF1	SW of Spring Valley	Fillmore	MN	43.651°N 92.4214°W	04:08–04:11	2.3 mi (3.7 km)	180 yd (160 m)	Farm buildings and trees were damaged.
EF0	S of Saratoga	Howard	IA	43.3276°N 92.4483°W	04:10–04:16	4.5 mi (7.2 km)	125 yd (114 m)	Trees were damaged by this weak tornado.
EF0	Northwestern Ridgeway	Winneshiek	IA	43.2965°N 92.0033°W	04:36–04:37	0.6 mi (0.97 km)	125 yd (114 m)	A weak tornado briefly touched town in the northwestern part of Ridgeway, where homes and a few other buildings sustained minor roof and window damage. Sheet metal debris was scattered and deposited in trees.
EF0	W of Fremont	Winona	MN	43.8998°N 91.9822°W	04:40–04:44	3.14 mi (5.05 km)	70 yd (64 m)	Radar and satellite imagery indicated a tornado over open fields.
EF0	Fremont	Winona	MN	43.9088°N 91.897°W	04:41–04:42	1.8 mi (2.9 km)	20 yd (18 m)	Minor tree damage occurred in the Fremont area as a result of this small, weak tornado.

=== April 13 event ===
List of confirmed tornadoes – Wednesday, April 13, 2022
EF#	Location	County / Parish	State	Start Coord.	Time (UTC)	Path length	Max width	Summary
EF1	Stilwell	Adair	OK	35.820°N 94.659°W	13:50–13:59	6.5 mi (10.5 km)	700 yd (640 m)	Numerous trees were snapped or uprooted, power poles were snapped, and a truck was blown over. Many apartment buildings, homes, and businesses were damaged in town. One person was injured.
EF1	WNW of Monette	Craighead	AR	35.8938°N 90.5171°W	19:36–19:42	5.36 mi (8.63 km)	200 yd (180 m)	Several trees and wooden high-tension power poles were downed. Several houses sustained roof damage as well.
EF0	NE of Leachville, AR to Hornersville, MO	Mississippi (AR), Dunklin (MO)	AR, MO	35.9719°N 90.2253°W	19:50–19:58	7.8 mi (12.6 km)	100 yd (91 m)	A manufactured home, an outbuilding, several center pivot irrigation systems, and trees were damaged. Additional irrigation systems were rolled.
EF0	West Ridge to S of Etowah	Mississippi	AR	35.6823°N 90.2637°W	20:00–20:02	1.88 mi (3.03 km)	75 yd (69 m)	A brief tornado struck an abandoned school building in West Ridge, blowing a large section of the roof into a nearby field.
EF0	NW of Water Valley	Hickman	KY	36.60°N 88.87°W	21:06–21:09	2.66 mi (4.28 km)	50 yd (46 m)	Trees were downed, and outbuildings were damaged.
EF1	WSW of Redwood	Warren, Issaquena	MS	32.4644°N 90.9808°W	21:14–21:32	9.81 mi (15.79 km)	1,320 yd (1,210 m)	The tornado moved over rural areas from Warren County, across southern Issaquena County, and back into Warren County. Many trees were snapped or uprooted.
EF1	NNE of Mayfield	Graves	KY	36.77°N 88.64°W	21:23–21:27	3.06 mi (4.92 km)	100 yd (91 m)	Metal barns sustained roof damage, a carport was flipped, billboards were damaged or destroyed, and wooden power poles were pushed over.
EF1	NNE of Redwood	Warren	MS	32.5159°N 90.7829°W	21:37–21:39	1.25 mi (2.01 km)	200 yd (180 m)	Numerous trees were snapped or uprooted.
EF0	NE of Briensburg (1st tornado)	Marshall	KY	36.91°N 88.31°W	21:50–21:51	0.88 mi (1.42 km)	25 yd (23 m)	A house sustained roof damage, an outbuilding lost its roof, and trees were downed.
EF1	Land Between the Lakes National Recreation Area	Trigg, Lyon	KY	36.88°N 88.06°W	21:51–21:56	4.78 mi (7.69 km)	150 yd (140 m)	Several trees were downed in the Land Between the Lakes National Recreation Area. The tornado dissipated after crossing Lake Barkley.
EF0	NE of Briensburg (2nd tornado)	Marshall	KY	36.91°N 88.29°W	21:53–21:54	0.69 mi (1.11 km)	25 yd (23 m)	This tornado occurred just east of the previous Briensburg area tornado. A house sustained siding damage, and a porch roof was lifted. A chicken coop was destroyed, a barn sustained roof damage, and trees were downed as well.
EF2	SE of Sikes to W of Columbia	Winn, Caldwell	LA	32.0117°N 92.4006°W	22:11–22:28	18.74 mi (30.16 km)	625 yd (572 m)	A strong tornado moved through forested areas, snapping and uprooting countless large trees.
EF0	SW of Crofton	Christian	KY	37.0107°N 87.5425°W	22:22-22:23	0.14 mi (0.23 km)	30 yd (27 m)	A witness reported a brief tornado touchdown in a field.
EF0	S of St. Charles	Hopkins	KY	37.13°N 87.57°W	22:34–22:35	0.88 mi (1.42 km)	25 yd (23 m)	Several small trees were snapped by this brief, weak tornado.
EF0	E of Flowood	Rankin	MS	32.3152°N 90.0910°W	23:19–23:24	2.82 mi (4.54 km)	25 yd (23 m)	A weak tornado downed a couple of trees and snapped small tree limbs. It moved across runways at the Jackson–Medgar Wiley Evers International Airport, with the funnel cloud being seen from the NWS Jackson office at the airport.
EF0	Corinth	Alcorn	MS	34.9251°N 88.5227°W	23:45–23:46	0.18 mi (0.29 km)	25 yd (23 m)	A very brief tornado embedded in a larger area of straight-line wind damage caused roof damage to two frail warehouse buildings in Corinth, with one also losing several walls. A metal power pole was damaged as well.
EF1	ESE of Upton	Larue	KY	37.45°N 85.874°W	00:13–00:16	2.6 mi (4.2 km)	200 yd (180 m)	A small barn was completely destroyed and others were damaged. A few homes sustained minor fascia and shingle damage, and trees were snapped or uprooted. The tornado occurred within a larger area of straight-line wind damage.
EF1	Fairmount	Jefferson	KY	38.114°N 85.613°W	00:23–00:30	7.2 mi (11.6 km)	175 yd (160 m)	This tornado caused considerable damage in the Louisville neighborhood of Fairmount. Numerous homes and apartment buildings sustained extensive roof and siding damage, including one house that had its roof blown off. Many trees were downed, a parked truck was moved from a driveway, and outbuildings were damaged.
EF0	SE of Buffalo	Larue	KY	37.486°N 85.68°W	00:23–00:27	3.8 mi (6.1 km)	200 yd (180 m)	A farm outbuilding sustained damage to its metal roof, and the lean-to attachment to the structure was destroyed. A few other outbuildings, homes, greenhouses, and an orchard structure sustained damage as well. A carport was demolished, and trees were snapped or uprooted.
EF0	W of Millhousen	Decatur	IN	39.2185°N 85.4947°W	00:27–00:28	0.11 mi (0.18 km)	25 yd (23 m)	The roof and wall of an outbuilding were damaged, with sheet metal roofing and wood tossed between 200–400 yards (180–370 m) to the north. A 2x4 was driven into the ground, and a small horse trailer was picked up and thrown.
EF0	W of Taylorsville	Spencer	KY	38.0477°N 85.4331°W	00:30	0.07 mi (0.11 km)	30 yd (27 m)	A brief, small tornado caused roof damage to a couple homes and scattered insulation into trees. A large satellite dish was thrown 20 yards (18 m) and wedged between two trees as well.
EF0	NNE of Taylorsville	Spencer	KY	38.087°N 85.333°W	00:35	0.12 mi (0.19 km)	60 yd (55 m)	Several homes sustained damage to shingles, flashing, siding, and gutters. A chicken coop was destroyed, and several trees were downed.
EF1	Northern Richland	Rankin	MS	32.2239°N 90.1810°W	00:35–00:41	4.86 mi (7.82 km)	250 yd (230 m)	Multiple trees and a couple power lines were downed on the north side of Richland.
EF0	S of Shelbyville	Shelby	KY	38.128°N 85.208°W	00:44	0.1 mi (0.16 km)	50 yd (46 m)	A brief, small tornado caused shingle damage to a home, picked up a dog house, removed roofing and siding from a large barn, and removed the roof of a 10-by-15-foot (3.0 m × 4.6 m) metal outbuilding. Several trees were downed as well.
EF1	SE of Shelbyville	Shelby	KY	38.147°N 85.171°W	00:45–00:46	0.21 mi (0.34 km)	100 yd (91 m)	A brief tornado caused significant roof and siding damage to three barns, with wood impaled into the ground and insulation and metal blown into trees. A few trees were twisted or snapped as well.
EF1	ESE of Shelbyville	Shelby	KY	38.165°N 85.126°W	00:48–00:53	3.52 mi (5.66 km)	125 yd (114 m)	A second tornado occurred in the Peytona area of Shelby County, touching down shortly after the previous tornado. The metal siding of a barn and sections of its roof were thrown up to 300 yards (270 m) away, a 10-by-15-foot (3.0 m × 4.6 m) storage building was picked up, destroyed, and scattered around 300 yards (270 m) as well. A large oak tree was uprooted and landed on a house, numerous other trees were snapped or twisted, several more barns sustained significant roof and siding damage, and several wooden telephone poles were snapped as well.
EF0	NE of Shelbyville	Shelby	KY	38.2805°N 85.1097°W	00:54–00:56	1.5 mi (2.4 km)	60 yd (55 m)	Many trees were twisted or uprooted. A barn sustained minor damage to its roof panels.
EF1	SSE of Pelahatchie to SSE of Morton	Rankin, Scott	MS	32.2878°N 89.7920°W	00:57–01:07	9.7 mi (15.6 km)	670 yd (610 m)	Trees were snapped and uprooted, tin roofing was ripped off a small farm building, and power lines were downed.
EF1	Edinburg to NNW of Philadelphia	Leake, Neshoba	MS	32.7922°N 89.3297°W	01:05–01:12	10.53 mi (16.95 km)	400 yd (370 m)	Numerous trees were downed, including one that fell onto a shed and vehicle. Some outbuildings were also damaged.
EF1	N of Philadelphia to WSW of Macon	Neshoba, Winston, Noxubee	MS	32.8454°N 89.1077°W	01:21–01:42	24.67 mi (39.70 km)	400 yd (370 m)	Many trees and several power poles and power lines were downed along the path, with several trees falling on homes, vehicles, and outbuildings. Near Vernon in Winston County, an awning at a convenience store was destroyed and part of the gas station canopy was damaged.
EF1	SE of Forest	Scott	MS	32.3226°N 89.4313°W	01:18–01:20	2.32 mi (3.73 km)	200 yd (180 m)	Trees were downed along the path.
EF1	E of Lake	Newton	MS	32.3287°N 89.2543°W	01:29–01:32	2.59 mi (4.17 km)	250 yd (230 m)	Trees were snapped or uprooted.
EF2	NE of Montrose to E of Whynot	Jasper, Clarke, Lauderdale	MS	32.1753°N 89.1721°W	01:36–02:19	43.08 mi (69.33 km)	1,800 yd (1,600 m)	This very large, long-tracked QLCS tornado damaged or downed hundreds of trees, snapped power poles, damaged homes and mobile homes, and heavily damaged or destroyed barns and outbuildings. The most intense damage occurred south of Meridian, in the Clarkdale area along the Clarke–Lauderdale county line. In this area, many large trees were snapped and twisted, and multiple homes had large sections of their roofs torn off. A school in Clarkdale lost a large part of its roof, and its baseball field and batting cage were heavily damaged. Some metal buildings were destroyed at the baseball field as well, and part of a sign was blown off a gas station, while a nearby business suffered minor damage to its metal siding. Mainly tree damage occurred elsewhere along the path. This was the second tornado to strike Clarkdale in 2022; an EF1 tornado struck the area on March 30, 2022.
EF1	NE of Seminary to SSW of Laurel	Jones	MS	31.6392°N 89.3953°W	01:44–02:01	14.58 mi (23.46 km)	500 yd (460 m)	A couple of sheds were destroyed, and a few manufactured homes sustained minor roof damage. Otherwise, mainly trees were damaged.
EF1	WSW of Crawford (1st tornado)	Winston, Noxubee, Oktibbeha	MS	33.2636°N 88.8424°W	01:51–01:59	6 mi (9.7 km)	700 yd (640 m)	This tornado moved through the Noxubee National Wildlife Refuge, just north of the following tornado. Many trees were downed along the path.
EF1	WSW of Crawford (2nd tornado)	Winston, Noxubee, Oktibbeha	MS	33.2324°N 88.8657°W	01:51–02:05	10.63 mi (17.11 km)	150 yd (140 m)	This tornado moved through the Noxubee National Wildlife Refuge, just south of the previous tornado. Many trees were downed along the path.
EF1	S of Sessums to ESE of Artesia	Oktibbeha, Lowndes	MS	33.3793°N 88.7226°W	02:03–02:15	9.27 mi (14.92 km)	450 yd (410 m)	Several small outbuildings and sheds were thrown or damaged, a utility pole was damaged, and numerous trees were downed.
EF1	ENE of Brooksville	Noxubee, Lowndes	MS	33.2246°N 88.4875°W	02:11–02:19	7.49 mi (12.05 km)	1,000 yd (910 m)	The damage was primarily in Noxubee County, where a house lost some shingles, two barns sustained partial roof loss and wall collapse, and a third barn was buckled and partially collapsed. Six center-pivot irrigation systems were overturned, and many trees were downed. In Lowndes County, more trees were downed, and a home sustained roof and decking damage.
EF1	Eutaw to S of Moundville	Greene, Hale	AL	32.8184°N 87.9020°W	02:35–02:56	17.61 mi (28.34 km)	400 yd (370 m)	A tornado embedded within a larger area of damaging straight-line winds caused damage to at least 40 homes in the Branch Heights neighborhood of Eutaw. A couple homes lost much of their roofs, along with a business and an administrative building. It crossed into Hale County, moving through Akron and causing minor roof damage to an apartment building before dissipating just north of Havana. Numerous trees were downed along the path. No tornado warning was ever issued for the tornado.
EF0	ESE of Moundville	Hale	AL	32.9510°N 87.4442°W	03:11–03:12	0.65 mi (1.05 km)	50 yd (46 m)	Several trees were snapped or uprooted in the Talladega National Forest. This tornado occurred just a few hundred yards west of an EF2 tornado on February 3.
EF0	NNW of Windham Springs	Tuscaloosa	AL	33.5018°N 87.5660°W	03:30–03:38	5.23 mi (8.42 km)	300 yd (270 m)	Several trees were uprooted, tree limbs were broken off, and a manufactured home sustained skirting, siding, and shingle damage.

=== April 17 event ===
List of confirmed tornadoes – Sunday, April 17, 2022
EF#	Location	County / Parish	State	Start Coord.	Time (UTC)	Path length	Max width
EF1	E of Mendenhall	Simpson	MS	31.9613°N 89.8453°W	00:00–00:03	0.81 mi (1.30 km)	75 yd (69 m)
EF1	A brief tornado snapped and twisted trees.						
EFU	WSW of Bassfield	Jefferson Davis	MS	31.4949°N 89.7611°W	00:20–00:21	0.2 mi (0.32 km)	25 yd (23 m)
EFU	A brief tornado was caught on video by a storm chaser. No damage was found.						
EF1	N of Laurel	Jones	MS	31.7763°N 89.1332°W	01:01–01:06	2.9 mi (4.7 km)	150 yd (140 m)
EF1	Trees were uprooted, and tree limbs were broken.						
EF1	W of Richton	Perry	MS	31.3579°N 88.9778°W	01:19–01:20	0.26 mi (0.42 km)	50 yd (46 m)
EF1	A brief tornado destroyed a barn, heavily damaged a second barn, and caused shingle damage to a home. Additionally, a carport was picked up and thrown a couple hundred yards into power lines. Several trees were downed, and large branches were snapped.						
EF2	Beaumont	Perry	MS	31.1805°N 88.9366°W	01:52–01:54	1.66 mi (2.67 km)	275 yd (251 m)
EF2	This tornado touched down to the northwest of Beaumont, where two large metal buildings at a lumber mill were extensively damaged, with one being totally collapsed. The tornado then moved directly through town, where the roofs of a house and a church were damaged, and a shed adjacent to the church was destroyed. A second much larger shed was destroyed as well, power poles were damaged, one of which was snapped at the base, and large trees were snapped or uprooted, with one falling on a manufactured home.						
EF2	SSE of Avera	Greene	MS	31.2869°N 88.7427°W	02:02–02:06	1.77 mi (2.85 km)	400 yd (370 m)
EF2	A shed was blown onto its side, a grain holder was tossed, and metal roofing was torn off a barn. A power pole was downed, and many large trees were snapped or uprooted, with one falling on a vehicle and others impacting two manufactured homes. A large tree branch impaled the side of one manufactured home, injuring a woman inside.						

=== April 21 event ===
List of confirmed tornadoes – Thursday, April 21, 2022
EF#	Location	County / Parish	State	Start Coord.	Time (UTC)	Path length	Max width
EFU	ESE of Isleton	San Joaquin	CA	38.11°N 121.48°W	20:20–20:21	0.02 mi (0.032 km)	16.67 yd (15.24 m)
EFU	A trained spotter recorded video of a brief, weak tornado. No damage was reported.						

=== April 22 event ===
List of confirmed tornadoes – Friday, April 22, 2022
EF#	Location	County / Parish	State	Start Coord.	Time (UTC)	Path length	Max width
EFU	NW of Wolsey	Beadle	SD	44.444°N 98.5351°W	01:39–01:40	0.09 mi (0.14 km)	25 yd (23 m)
EFU	A tornado remained over open fields with no known damage.						
EF1	Sharon Springs	Wallace	KS	38.8851°N 101.7555°W	04:42–04:45	3.02 mi (4.86 km)	350 yd (320 m)
EF1	A high-end EF1 tornado caused severe damage to a Kansas Department of Transportation station, toppling a cinder block building and demolishing a truck shed. An office had its roof completely ripped off, many trees were snapped or uprooted throughout Sharon Springs, many buildings and vehicles had broken windows, and power poles were snapped or downed. Several trailers were rolled, fences were blown down, and shingles were blown off roofs as well.						

=== April 23 event ===
List of confirmed tornadoes – Saturday, April 23, 2022
EF#	Location	County / Parish	State	Start Coord.	Time (UTC)	Path length	Max width
EF0	NE of Winona	Logan, Thomas	KS	39.1053°N 101.1829°W	05:28–05:35	5.77 mi (9.29 km)	100 yd (91 m)
EF0	A power pole was downed and a tornado debris signature appeared on radar.						
EFU	W of Monument	Logan, Thomas	KS	39.0736°N 101.1165°W	05:32–05:41	10.21 mi (16.43 km)	100 yd (91 m)
EFU	No damage was reported as this tornado moved over rural land.						
EF1	E of Selden	Sheridan, Decatur	KS	39.5062°N 100.558°W	06:20–06:28	5.62 mi (9.04 km)	125 yd (114 m)
EF1	Highway signs were downed or twisted, a tree trunk was snapped, and a few irrigation pivots were blown over. A railroad crossing gate was destroyed too.						
EF1	N of Grainfield	Sheridan	KS	39.1473°N 100.5375°W	06:28–06:36	7.76 mi (12.49 km)	125 yd (114 m)
EF1	A tornado was confirmed via video from a storm chaser. Several large trees limbs were snapped and a power pole was downed.						
EF0	E of Hosmer	Edmunds	SD	45.58°N 99.33°W	19:35–19:36	0.03 mi (0.048 km)	10 yd (9.1 m)
EF0	A tornado briefly touched down in an open pasture.						
EFU	W of Marion	LaMoure	ND	46.61°N 98.47°W	20:24–20:27	0.35 mi (0.56 km)	25 yd (23 m)
EFU	A tornado touched down in an open field.						
EF1	SE of Madrid to SW of Kelley	Polk, Boone, Story	IA	41.8472°N 93.8058°W	23:21–23:32	9.09 mi (14.63 km)	80 yd (73 m)
EF1	A QLCS tornado moved through rural land before snapping tree trunks and flipping a 5th wheel camper. As it moved through Boone County, the tornado only did minor tree damage. In Story County, a small empty feed bin was destroyed and tossed into a field.						
EFU	W of Slater	Polk, Boone	IA	41.8534°N 93.758°W	23:23–23:28	3.93 mi (6.32 km)	60 yd (55 m)
EFU	A tornado debris signature was produced on radar but no ground damage was found.						
EF0	S of Sheldahl	Polk	IA	41.8077°N 93.7029°W	23:24–23:27	2.43 mi (3.91 km)	75 yd (69 m)
EF0	A tornado hit a farmstead, minorly damaging trees and roofing.						
EF0	SE of Crookston	Polk	MN	47.68°N 96.47°W	23:55–23:57	0.28 mi (0.45 km)	50 yd (46 m)
EF0	The tornado tracked across open, wet fields and lasted less than a minute and causing no known damage.						
EF0	N of Tuttle	Grady	OK	35.311°N 97.855°W	00:01–00:10	3.75 mi (6.04 km)	30 yd (27 m)
EF0	Trees and the roof of an outbuilding were damaged.						
EFU	SSW of Mustang	Canadian	OK	35.332°N 97.748°W	00:15–00:16	0.3 mi (0.48 km)	50 yd (46 m)
EFU	A weather observer reported a brief tornado. Any damage could not be reached by surveyors.						
EF0	WSW of Harrah	Oklahoma	OK	35.469°N 97.214°W	01:20–01:22	0.8 mi (1.3 km)	30 yd (27 m)
EF0	Trees were damaged. This tornado occurred within a much broader region of straight-line wind damage.						
EF0	NW of Harrah	Oklahoma	OK	35.534°N 97.214°W	01:25–01:27	0.6 mi (0.97 km)	20 yd (18 m)
EF0	Minor tree damage occurred.						

=== April 24 event ===
List of confirmed tornadoes – Sunday, April 24, 2022
EF#	Location	County / Parish	State	Start Coord.	Time (UTC)	Path length	Max width
EF0	WSW of Pauls Valley	Garvin	OK	34.723°N 97.265°W	06:57–07:00	0.3 mi (0.48 km)	50 yd (46 m)
EF0	A salon was damaged, and farm implements were pushed. This tornado occurred within a much broader area of straight-line winds that impacted the Pauls Valley area.						
EF1	ENE of Sharpsburg	Christian	IL	39.6236°N 89.2993°W	22:49–22:50	0.89 mi (1.43 km)	50 yd (46 m)
EF1	A shed was demolished, and resulting debris was thrown about 1 mile (1.6 km) downstream.						

=== April 25 event ===
List of confirmed tornadoes – Monday, April 25, 2022
EF#	Location	County / Parish	State	Start Coord.	Time (UTC)	Path length	Max width
EF0	E of Eaton Estates	Lorain	OH	41.3081°N 81.9736°W	18:22–18:23	0.08 mi (0.13 km)	75 yd (69 m)
EF0	A brief tornado damaged industrial buildings and vehicles.						
EF0	Northeastern Alexander	Genesee	NY	42.8975°N 78.2628°W	22:42–22:45	0.75 mi (1.21 km)	75 yd (69 m)
EF0	A pavilion sustained roof damage, a building's metal roof was peeled back, a trailer was rolled onto its side, and homes had shingle damage and broken windows. Several trees were downed as well.						

=== April 26 event ===
List of confirmed tornadoes – Tuesday, April 26, 2022
EF#	Location	County / Parish	State	Start Coord.	Time (UTC)	Path length	Max width
EF1	SW of Fishersville to Waynesboro	Augusta, City of Waynesboro	VA	38.0796°N 79.0172°W	17:04–17:15	5.98 mi (9.62 km)	75 yd (69 m)
EF1	Near Fisherville, a barn sustained significant roof and structural damage, with wood thrown about 125 yards (114 m) and impaled into the ground. A farmhouse lost portions of its metal roof which were wrapped around trees. The siding, roofs, and screens of permanent houses and manufactured homes were damaged. Two 75 yards (69 m) sections of fencing were blown inward, a grease dumpster was flipped, and an office complex sustained minor damage. The steeple of a church in Waynesboro was toppled, and trees in town were snapped or uprooted, some of which fell on homes.						

=== April 28 event ===
List of confirmed tornadoes – Thursday, April 28, 2022
EF#	Location	County / Parish	State	Start Coord.	Time (UTC)	Path length	Max width
EFU	N of Woodruff	Harlan	NE	40.03°N 99.43°W	23:30	0.01 mi (0.016 km)	20 yd (18 m)
EFU	A storm chaser captured a tornado briefly touch down in open country causing no damage.						

=== April 29 event ===
List of confirmed tornadoes – Friday, April 29, 2022
EF#	Location	County / Parish	State	Start Coord.	Time (UTC)	Path length	Max width
EF0	SSW of Fort Myers	Lee	FL	26.5285°N 81.894°W	21:00–21:01	0.1 mi (0.16 km)	25 yd (23 m)
EF0	A very brief tornado caused roof damage to a house and damaged a carport and a fence.						
EFU	S of Stamford	Harlan	NE	40.04°N 99.61°W	21:52–21:57	1.26 mi (2.03 km)	20 yd (18 m)
EFU	Tornado tracked over open country.						
EFU	SW of Orleans	Harlan	NE	40.10°N 99.51°W	22:12	0.01 mi (0.016 km)	20 yd (18 m)
EFU	A tornado touched down briefly and was confirmed from photos. No damage reported.						
EFU	N of Hildreth	Kearney	NE	40.42°N 99.03°W	22:39–22:41	1.26 mi (2.03 km)	20 yd (18 m)
EFU	Tornado tracked over open country, causing no damage.						
EF0	NW of Hope	Dickinson	KS	38.75°N 97.19°W	23:31–23:35	1.28 mi (2.06 km)	50 yd (46 m)
EF0	A funnel was observed with a weak debris cloud, which lofted debris into the air.						
EF0	E of Ruskin to W of Deshler	Nuckolls, Thayer	NE	40.12°N 97.84°W	00:05–00:12	4.77 mi (7.68 km)	35 yd (32 m)
EF0	Minor damage was done to a cemetery shelter, and numerous irrigation pivots were damaged.						
EF1	SE of Carlton to W of Ramona	Dickinson, Marion	KS	38.62°N 97.23°W	00:52–01:10	4.17 mi (6.71 km)	50 yd (46 m)
EF1	A cemetery gate was blown over, an outbuilding was damaged, a house had broken windows, and trees were snapped.						
EF1	NW of Herington to Parkerville	Dickinson, Morris	KS	38.68°N 97.05°W	01:00–01:28	21.76 mi (35.02 km)	50 yd (46 m)
EF1	A weak but long-tracked tornado touched down near Herington and moved through rural areas to the northeast, where a few homes suffered considerable damage to their roofs, porches, and windows. A detached garage was damaged, several barns and outbuildings were damaged or destroyed, and an old metal silo was knocked over and tossed 50 yd (46 m). Trees were snapped in Parkerville before the tornado dissipated.						
EF1	NNW of Schuyler	Colfax	NE	41.46°N 97.11°W	01:02–01:04	3.35 mi (5.39 km)	20 yd (18 m)
EF1	Around 20 power poles were snapped, and a pivot irrigation system was overturned.						
EF1	E of St. George to N of Belvue	Pottawatomie, Wabaunsee	KS	39.19°N 96.38°W	01:03–01:18	11.05 mi (17.78 km)	100 yd (91 m)
EF1	A house and an outbuilding sustained roof damage, a farm windmill was destroyed, and a carport was also destroyed. Irrigation pivots were flipped, and trees were snapped as well. The tornado crossed the Pottawatomie/Wabaunsee county line four times.						
EF1	SSE of Durham	Marion	KS	38.4493°N 97.2048°W	01:03–01:08	0.91 mi (1.46 km)	50 yd (46 m)
EF1	Trees were snapped, tree limbs were broken, and a boat on a trailer was overturned.						
EF0	SW of Lehigh	Marion	KS	38.3475°N 97.3368°W	01:03–01:05	0.08 mi (0.13 km)	30 yd (27 m)
EF0	A brief tornado caused minor tree damage.						
EF1	S of Douglas	Otoe	NE	40.53°N 96.39°W	01:10–01:12	0.84 mi (1.35 km)	100 yd (91 m)
EF1	A barn was collapsed, sheds were damaged, shingles were torn off a home, and trees were downed.						
EF3	SW of Andover to ESE of Benton	Sedgwick, Butler	KS	37.6262°N 97.193°W	01:10–01:31	12.65 mi (20.36 km)	250 yd (230 m)
EF3	See article on this tornado – Three people sustained injuries from the tornado, and another three people sustained secondary injuries during rescue and cleanup efforts.						
EF0	NW of Hillsboro	Marion	KS	38.3640°N 97.2239°W	01:10–01:12	0.16 mi (0.26 km)	30 yd (27 m)
EF0	This brief tornado moved through an open field, causing no damage.						
EF1	N of Douglas	Otoe	NE	40.6072°N 96.3882°W	01:18–01:19	0.05 mi (0.080 km)	100 yd (91 m)
EF1	One shed was destroyed and another was damaged.						
EFU	S of Hesston	Harvey	KS	38.073°N 97.443°W	01:19–01:20	0.16 mi (0.26 km)	50 yd (46 m)
EFU	Brief touchdown in open country.						
EF1	NE of Delia	Jackson	KS	39.32°N 95.88°W	01:37–01:44	3.28 mi (5.28 km)	40 yd (37 m)
EF1	A small tornado severely damaged a pole barn, ripped shingles off roofs, and snapped trees.						
EFU	S of El Dorado	Butler	KS	37.78°N 96.89°W	01:47–01:48	0.19 mi (0.31 km)	50 yd (46 m)
EFU	A brief tornado touched down in open country.						
EF1	ESE of El Dorado to NE of Rosalia	Butler	KS	37.79°N 96.72°W	02:05–02:24	8.13 mi (13.08 km)	440 yd (400 m)
EF1	Barns and outbuildings were damaged or destroyed as a result of this multiple-vortex tornado, and the roof of a barn was lifted and carried across a highway. Trees and fences were damaged, and minor damage occurred in Rosalia before the tornado dissipated.						
EF1	Unadilla	Otoe	NE	40.68°N 96.27°W	02:24–02:25	0.09 mi (0.14 km)	40 yd (37 m)
EF1	A brief tornado occurred in Unadilla, where a house had most of its poorly attached roof blown off, and a few other homes had less severe roof and window damage. A rotten tree trunk was snapped, tree limbs were broken, and a small tree branch was impaled into the exterior wall of a house.						
EF1	WNW of Eureka	Greenwood	KS	37.84°N 96.41°W	02:44–02:45	0.03 mi (0.048 km)	60 yd (55 m)
EF1	A brief tornado rolled a camper and tossed an outbuilding.						

=== April 30 event ===
List of confirmed tornadoes – Saturday, April 30, 2022
EF#	Location	County / Parish	State	Start Coord.	Time (UTC)	Path length	Max width
EF0	SW of Oak Brook	DuPage	IL	41.8370°N 87.9453°W	21:44–21:47	1.9 mi (3.1 km)	60 yd (55 m)
EF0	Part of the roof was ripped off an outbuilding, and trees were snapped or uprooted.						
EF0	NW of Perryville	Perry	MO	37.7626°N 89.9291°W	22:02–22:03	0.1 mi (0.16 km)	50 yd (46 m)
EF0	A machine shed was damaged and another machine shed was destroyed, with flying debris causing some damage to a nearby home, and a piece of lumber being found speared into the ground. Tin roofing from the machine sheds was found deposited in trees. Another house sustained gutter and soffit damage, and tree branches were impaled into the exterior of the structure. A barn sustained roof damage, and trees and tree limbs were downed as well.						
EF0	N of Timberlane	Boone	IL	42.3516°N 88.8716°W	22:54–22:55	0.5 mi (0.80 km)	60 yd (55 m)
EF0	Several trees were snapped or uprooted, and several floating docks were thrown across Candlewick Lake.						
EFU	S of Sharon	Boone	IL	42.4758°N 88.7416°W	23:07–23:08	0.12 mi (0.19 km)	30 yd (27 m)
EFU	A brief tornado occurred in an open field, causing no damage.						
EF0	NE of Tull	Grant	AR	34.4541°N 92.5564°W	23:14–23:17	0.34 mi (0.55 km)	50 yd (46 m)
EF0	A brief tornado remained over private timber company; no damage was observed.						
EFU	SW of Colfax	McLean	IL	40.5399°N 88.6605°W	23:46–23:47	0.31 mi (0.50 km)	30 yd (27 m)
EFU	A trained spotter reported a tornado. No damage was found.						
EF0	SW of Des Arc	Prairie	AR	34.9509°N 91.5458°W	23:52–23:55	0.29 mi (0.47 km)	100 yd (91 m)
EF0	The roof and doors were ripped off a farm shop, and propane tanks were moved. Two trees were blown over, and multiple power poles were snapped.						

== See also ==
- Tornadoes of 2022
- List of United States tornadoes from January to March 2022
- List of United States tornadoes from May to June 2022
