= Kite, Georgia =

- City
- Location in Johnson County, Georgia
- Coordinates: 32°41′29″N 82°30′55″W
- Country: United States
- State: Georgia
- County: Johnson

Area
  - Total: 0.81 sq mi (2.10 km^{2})
  - Land: 0.81 sq mi (2.09 km^{2})
  - Water: 0.0039 sq mi (0.01 km^{2})
- Elevation: 249 ft (76 m)

Population (2020)
  - Total: 160
  - Density: 198.6/sq mi (76.68/km^{2})
- Time zone: UTC-5 (Eastern (EST))
  - Summer (DST): UTC-4 (EDT)
- ZIP code: 31049
- Area code: 478
- FIPS code: 13-43892
- GNIS feature ID: 0316484
- Website: kite.georgia.gov

Kite is a city in Johnson County, Georgia, United States, along the Little Ohoopee River. The population was 160 in 2020.

== History ==
The town was named after Shaderick Kight, who donated the land to build the town. He requested the simpler spelling of the name for more efficient mail delivery and processing.

The Georgia General Assembly incorporated Kite in 1891.

== Geography ==
Kite is located in eastern Johnson County at 32°41′29″N 82°30′55″W (32.691472, -82.515378). U.S. Route 221 passes through the center of town as Montgomery Street, leading north 14 miles (23 km) to Bartow and south 25 miles (40 km) to Soperton. Georgia State Route 57 (Kight Road) crosses US 221 in the center of Kite, leading west 12 miles (19 km) to Wrightsville, the Johnson county seat, and southeast 13 miles (21 km) to Swainsboro.

According to the United States Census Bureau, Kite has a total area of 0.81 square miles (2.1 km^{2}), of which 0.004 square miles (0.01 km^{2}), or 0.63%, are water.

=== Climate ===
Climate data for Kite, Georgia, 1991–2020 normals, extremes 2004–present
Month	Jan	Feb	Mar	Apr	May	Jun	Jul	Aug	Sep	Oct	Nov	Dec	Year
Record high °F (°C)	81 (27)	83 (28)	91 (33)	94 (34)	101 (38)	105 (41)	109 (43)	105 (41)	100 (38)	101 (38)	86 (30)	82 (28)	109 (43)
Mean maximum °F (°C)	74.3 (23.5)	78.3 (25.7)	84.5 (29.2)	89.1 (31.7)	94.4 (34.7)	99.0 (37.2)	99.8 (37.7)	99.1 (37.3)	95.9 (35.5)	90.1 (32.3)	82.6 (28.1)	78.0 (25.6)	101.0 (38.3)
Mean daily maximum °F (°C)	57.8 (14.3)	61.6 (16.4)	69.0 (20.6)	76.8 (24.9)	83.9 (28.8)	90.4 (32.4)	92.7 (33.7)	91.2 (32.9)	87.0 (30.6)	77.9 (25.5)	67.7 (19.8)	59.6 (15.3)	76.3 (24.6)
Daily mean °F (°C)	46.2 (7.9)	49.1 (9.5)	55.8 (13.2)	63.1 (17.3)	71.0 (21.7)	78.5 (25.8)	81.3 (27.4)	80.1 (26.7)	75.0 (23.9)	65.0 (18.3)	54.5 (12.5)	48.0 (8.9)	64.0 (17.8)
Mean daily minimum °F (°C)	34.7 (1.5)	36.7 (2.6)	42.6 (5.9)	49.4 (9.7)	58.0 (14.4)	66.5 (19.2)	69.9 (21.1)	68.9 (20.5)	63.0 (17.2)	52.1 (11.2)	41.3 (5.2)	36.4 (2.4)	51.6 (10.9)
Mean minimum °F (°C)	17.9 (−7.8)	21.1 (−6.1)	25.8 (−3.4)	33.2 (0.7)	42.3 (5.7)	57.1 (13.9)	61.2 (16.2)	61.0 (16.1)	50.1 (10.1)	34.7 (1.5)	24.3 (−4.3)	22.0 (−5.6)	16.1 (−8.8)
Record low °F (°C)	10 (−12)	14 (−10)	21 (−6)	24 (−4)	36 (2)	51 (11)	55 (13)	56 (13)	42 (6)	28 (−2)	14 (−10)	12 (−11)	10 (−12)
Average precipitation inches (mm)	4.26 (108)	4.06 (103)	4.44 (113)	3.44 (87)	3.16 (80)	5.29 (134)	4.95 (126)	4.98 (126)	4.03 (102)	2.92 (74)	3.11 (79)	4.33 (110)	48.97 (1,242)
Average snowfall inches (cm)	0.0 (0.0)	0.2 (0.51)	0.0 (0.0)	0.0 (0.0)	0.0 (0.0)	0.0 (0.0)	0.0 (0.0)	0.0 (0.0)	0.0 (0.0)	0.0 (0.0)	0.0 (0.0)	0.0 (0.0)	0.2 (0.51)
Average precipitation days (≥ 0.01 in)	9.1	8.8	7.8	7.5	7.8	8.4	10.6	10.8	7.6	5.2	6.8	10.6	101.0
Average snowy days (≥ 0.1 in)	0.1	0.1	0.0	0.0	0.0	0.0	0.0	0.0	0.0	0.0	0.0	0.1	0.3
Source 1: NOAA
Source 2: National Weather Service (mean maxima/minima, precip days, snow/snow days 2006–2020)

== Demographics ==
Historical population
Census	Pop.	Note	%±
1900	156		—
1910	241		54.5%
1920	344		42.7%
1930	433		25.9%
1940	472		9.0%
1950	447		−5.3%
1960	424		−5.1%
1970	336		−20.8%
1980	328		−2.4%
1990	297		−9.5%
2000	241		−18.9%
2010	241		0.0%
2020	160		−33.6%
U.S. Decennial Census

=== Racial and ethnic composition ===
Kite city, Georgia – Racial and ethnic composition Note: the US Census treats Hispanic/Latino as an ethnic category. This table excludes Latinos from the racial categories and assigns them to a separate category. Hispanics/Latinos may be of any race.
Race / Ethnicity (NH = Non-Hispanic)	Pop 2000	Pop 2010	Pop 2020	% 2000	% 2010	% 2020
White alone (NH)	228	210	154	94.61%	87.14%	96.25%
Black or African American alone (NH)	7	10	4	2.90%	4.15%	2.50%
Native American or Alaska Native alone (NH)	0	2	1	0.00%	0.83%	0.63%
Asian alone (NH)	0	1	0	0.00%	0.41%	0.00%
Native Hawaiian or Pacific Islander alone (NH)	0	0	0	0.00%	0.00%	0.00%
Other race alone (NH)	0	0	0	0.00%	0.00%	0.00%
Mixed race or Multiracial (NH)	0	1	0	0.00%	0.41%	0.00%
Hispanic or Latino (any race)	6	17	1	2.49%	7.05%	0.63%
Total	241	241	160	100.00%	100.00%	100.00%

=== 2000 census ===
As of the census of 2000, there were 241 people, 108 households, and 68 families residing in the town. By 2020, its population declined to 160.
