= Pine Level, Montgomery County, Alabama =

Pine Level, Alabama
- Unincorporated community
- Location within Alabama Location within the United States
- Coordinates: 32°04′05″N 86°03′35″W
- Country: United States
- State: Alabama
- County: Montgomery
- Elevation: 489 ft (149 m)

Population (2007)
  - Total: 1,782
- Time zone: UTC-6 (Central (CST))
  - Summer (DST): UTC-5 (CDT)
- ZIP code: 36069
- Area code: 334
- GNIS feature ID: 152926

Pine Level, also known as Pine Tucky, is an unincorporated community in Montgomery County, Alabama, United States. Pine Level is located along U.S. Route 231 (also known as Alabama State Route 53), 25 miles (40 km) southeast of Montgomery.

== History ==
Pine Level was originally known as Pine Tucky, most likely due to its location on poor sandy soil covered with pine trees. The community later began to be called Pine Level. A post office first opened under the name Pine Level in 1839.

== Notable people ==
- Rosa Parks, her arrest served as a catalyst to the Montgomery bus boycott during the Civil Rights Movement. She lived in Pine Level as a child.
- Claudette Colvin, arrested for refusing to give up her seat on a segregated bus, nine months before Rosa Parks was arrested for doing the same thing. She lived in Pine Level until she was 8 years old.
