= Petrey, Alabama =

- Town
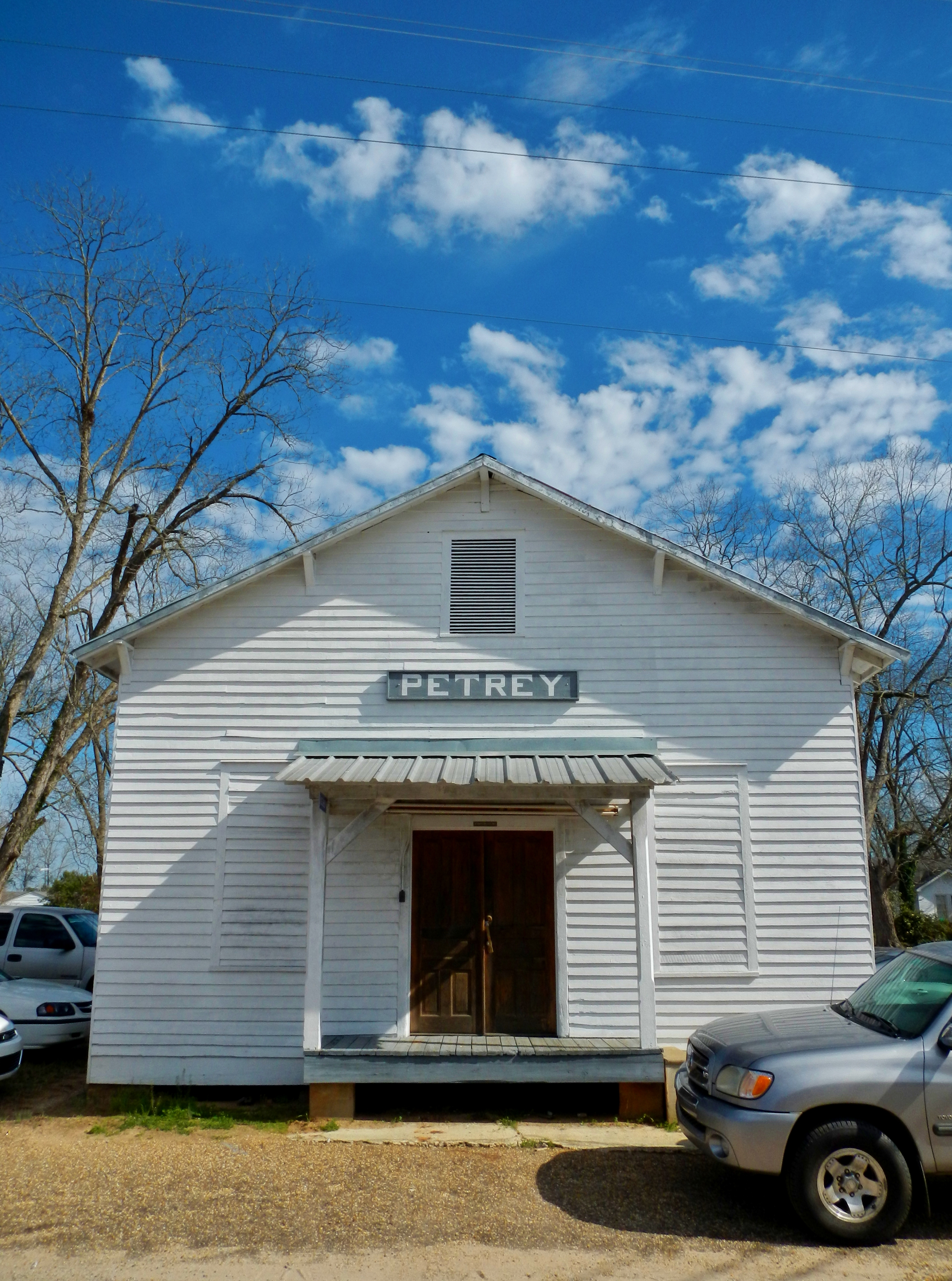
- Petrey, Alabama in 2012

- Location of Petrey in Crenshaw County, Alabama.
- Coordinates: 31°51′1″N 86°12′26″W
- Country: United States
- State: Alabama
- County: Crenshaw

Area
  - Total: 0.75 sq mi (1.94 km^{2})
  - Land: 0.73 sq mi (1.90 km^{2})
  - Water: 0.015 sq mi (0.04 km^{2})
- Elevation: 364 ft (111 m)

Population (2020)
  - Total: 67
  - Density: 91.3/sq mi (35.26/km^{2})
- Time zone: UTC-6 (Central (CST))
  - Summer (DST): UTC-5 (CDT)
- ZIP code: 36062
- Area code: 334
- FIPS code: 01-59328
- GNIS feature ID: 0124652

Petrey is a town in Crenshaw County, Alabama, United States. As of the 2020 census, Petrey had a population of 67.

== Geography ==
Petrey is located in northeastern Crenshaw County at 31°51′1″N 86°12′26″W (31.850329, −86.207212).

According to the U.S. Census Bureau, the town has a total area of 0.73 square miles (1.9 km^{2}), of which 0.02 square miles (0.04 km^{2}), or 2.21%, is water.

The town of Petrey was named after a man who owned a large cotton plantation. The railroad wanted to use some of his land, and he agreed. The railroad company established a train station on the land, and named it after him.

== Demographics ==
Historical population
Census	Pop.	Note	%±
1920	165		—
1930	168		1.8%
1940	258		53.6%
1950	171		−33.7%
1960	165		−3.5%
1970	122		−26.1%
1980	93		−23.8%
1990	80		−14.0%
2000	63		−21.2%
2010	58		−7.9%
2020	67		15.5%
U.S. Decennial Census

As of the census of 2000, there were 63 people, 28 households, and 15 families residing in the town. The population density was 85.6 inhabitants per square mile (33.1/km^{2}). There were 37 housing units at an average density of 50.2 per square mile (19.4/km^{2}). The racial makeup of the town was 95.24% White and 4.76% Black or African American. 4.76% of the population were Hispanic or Latino of any race.

There were 28 households, out of which 25.0% had children under the age of 18 living with them, 53.6% were married couples living together (3.6% same-sex couples), 3.6% had a female householder with no husband present, and 42.9% were non-families. 39.3% of all households were made up of individuals, and 17.9% had someone living alone who was 65 years of age or older. The average household size was 2.25 and the average family size was 3.13.

In the town, the population was spread out, with 14.3% under the age of 18, 12.7% from 18 to 24, 22.2% from 25 to 44, 30.2% from 45 to 64, and 20.6% who were 65 years of age or older. The median age was 46 years. For every 100 females, there were 90.9 males. For every 100 females age 18 and over, there were 100.0 males.

The median income for a household in the town was $34,583, and the median income for a family was $50,833. Males had a median income of $26,500 versus $26,000 for females. The per capita income for the town was $20,659. There were no families and 5.4% of the population living below the poverty line, including no under eighteens and 18.2% of those over 64.
