= McEntyre, Alabama =

Unincorporated community in Alabama, United States

- Unincorporated community
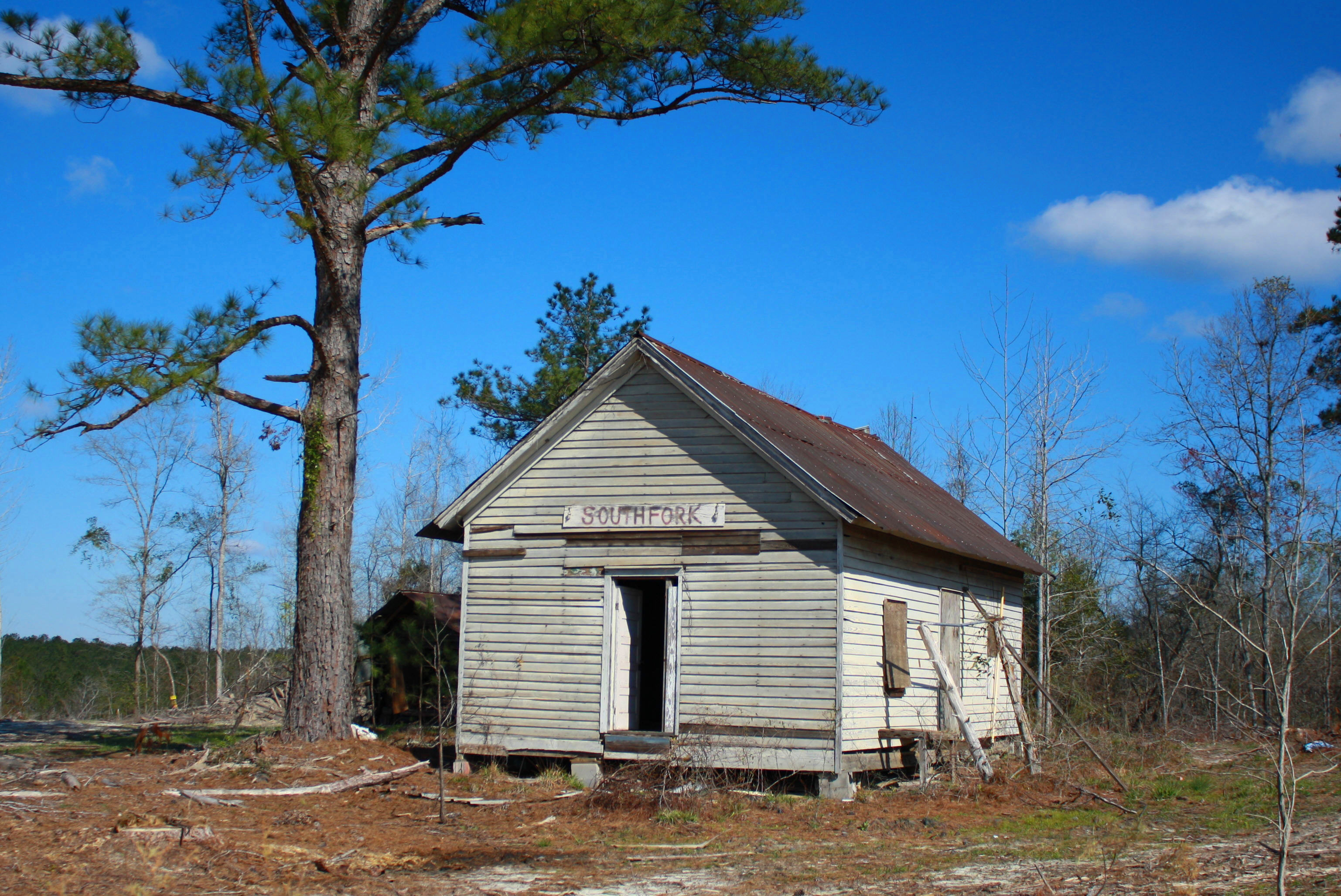
- Abandoned schoolhouse in the community

- Location within the state of Alabama McEntyre, Alabama (the United States)
- Coordinates: 31°48′31″N 87°57′56″W
- Country: United States
- State: Alabama
- County: Clarke
- Elevation: 236 ft (72 m)
- Time zone: UTC-6 (Central (CST))
  - Summer (DST): UTC-5 (CDT)
- Area code: 251
- GNIS feature ID: 156686

McEntyre is an unincorporated community in Clarke County, Alabama, United States, also referred to as Bedsole, Mitcham Beat and New Prospect.

It has been described as "Clarke County's Criminal Colony."
