= Whynot, Mississippi =

- Unincorporated community
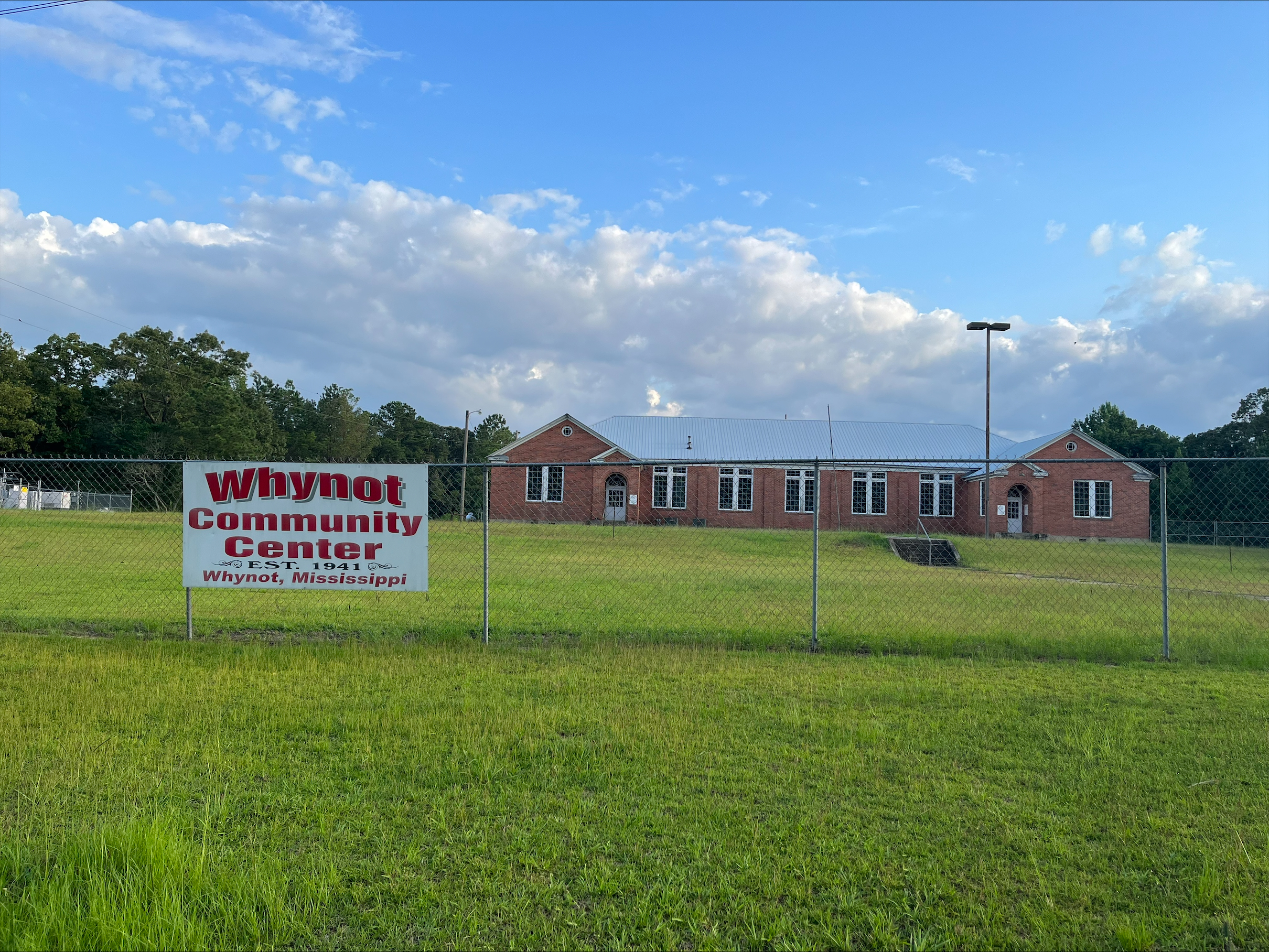
- Whynot Community Center

- Location within Mississippi Location within the United States
- Coordinates: 32°17′21″N 88°29′25″W
- Country: United States
- State: Mississippi
- County: Lauderdale
- Elevation: 492 ft (150 m)
- Time zone: UTC-6 (Central (CST))
  - Summer (DST): UTC-5 (CDT)
- ZIP code: 39301
- Area code: 601
- GNIS feature ID: 713095

Whynot is an unincorporated community located in Lauderdale County, Mississippi. Whynot is approximately 16.3 miles (26.2 km) southeast of Meridian on Mississippi Highway 19 and is part of Meridian, Mississippi Micropolitan Statistical Area.

== History ==
The area was first served by a post office called Whitesville, which was established June 23, 1852, with Isham K. Pringle as first postmaster. The name was changed to Why Not (two words) on December 30, 1852, and was finally discontinued September 30, 1933, with mail thereafter going to Meridian.

== Notable native ==
- David Ruffin, musician (the Temptations)
