= Cuba, Georgia =

Unincorporated community in Georgia, U.S.

Coordinates: 31°17′33″N 84°51′51″W

Cuba is an unincorporated community in Early County, in the U.S. state of Georgia. It is located two to three miles (3.2 to 4.8 km) south of Blakely.

== History ==
A post office called Cuba was established in 1883, and remained in operation until 1890. The community takes its name from the island of Cuba.
