= Wesley, Georgia =

Unincorporated community in Georgia, U.S.

Coordinates: 32°29′0.60″N 82°19′51.46″W

Wesley is an unincorporated community in Emanuel County, in the U.S. state of Georgia.

== History ==
A post office called Wesley was established in 1912, and remained in operation until 1950. The community was believed to be named after John Wesley (1703–1791), the Anglican cleric and theologian, and founder of Methodism.

The Georgia General Assembly incorporated Wesley as a town in 1913. The town's municipal charter was repealed in 1995.
