= Lawrence, Mississippi =

- Unincorporated community
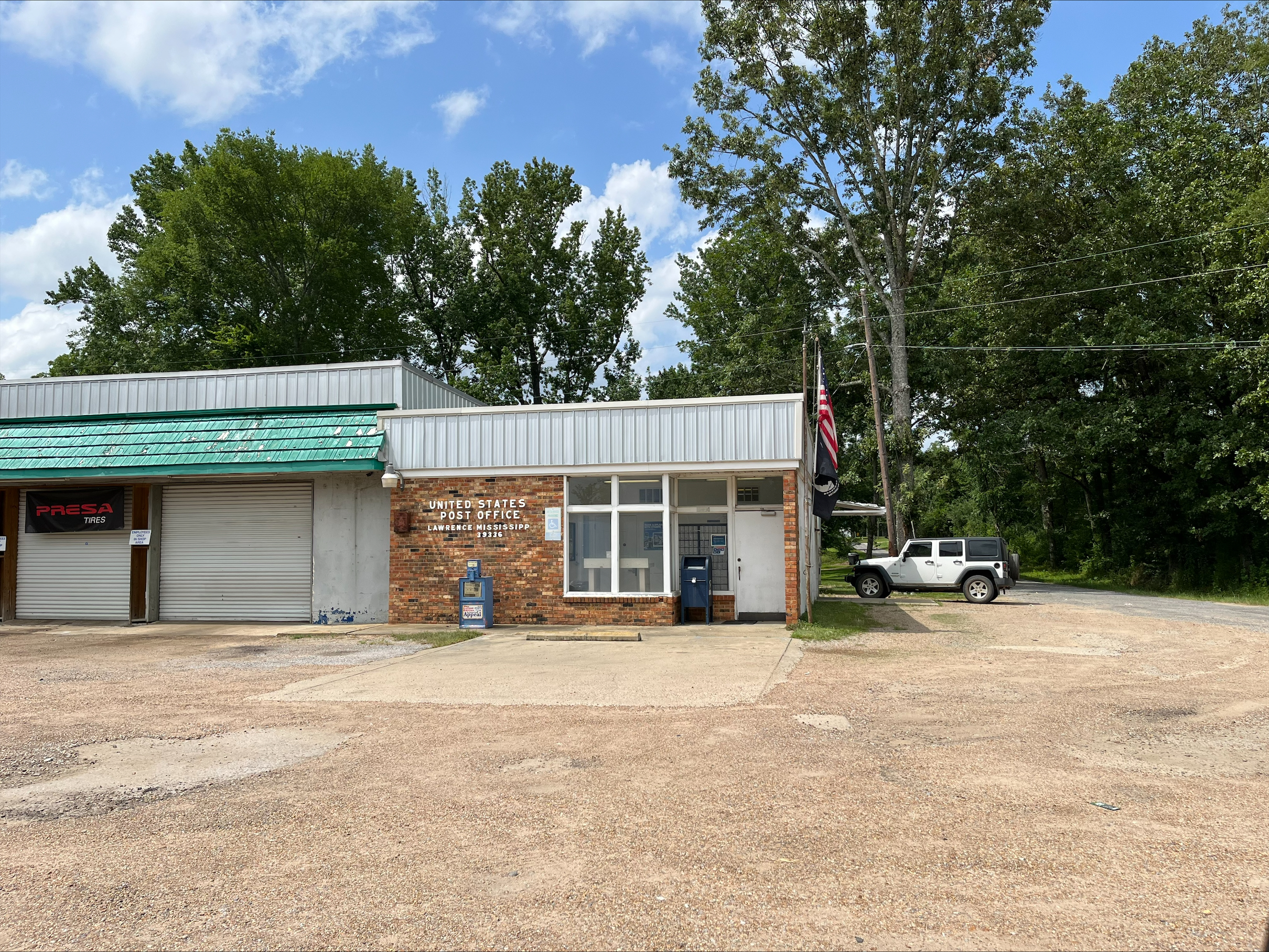
- Post office in Lawrence

- Location within Mississippi Location within the United States
- Coordinates: 32°19′31″N 89°13′58″W
- Country: United States
- State: Mississippi
- County: Newton
- Elevation: 456 ft (139 m)
- Time zone: UTC-6 (Central (CST))
  - Summer (DST): UTC-5 (CDT)
- ZIP code: 39336
- Area codes: 601 & 769
- GNIS feature ID: 693692

Lawrence is an unincorporated community in Newton County, Mississippi, United States.

== History ==
Lawrence was established in 1866 and named for a railroad employee. A post office was established in 1867. Lawrence was a thriving town with multiple mills, stores, a town physician, and churches. In 1878, Lawrence experienced a yellow fever epidemic, which decreased its population size. Several people also left Lawrence. After the epidemic, the town was busier, with several business firms and mills. Its economy relied heavily on the fruit crop it was locally noted for. By the 1900s, Lawrence had two churches, several general stores, and a grist mill. The population in 1900 was 75, and was estimated to be 125 by 1906.
