= Malvern, Alabama =

- Town
- Location of Malvern in Geneva County, Alabama.
- Coordinates: 31°08′38″N 85°31′14″W
- Country: United States
- State: Alabama
- County: Geneva

Area
  - Total: 14.03 sq mi (36.33 km^{2})
  - Land: 14.02 sq mi (36.31 km^{2})
  - Water: 0.0039 sq mi (0.01 km^{2})
- Elevation: 295 ft (90 m)

Population (2020)
  - Total: 1,536
  - Density: 110/sq mi (42.3/km^{2})
- Time zone: UTC-6 (Central (CST))
  - Summer (DST): UTC-5 (CDT)
- ZIP code: 36349
- Area code: 334
- FIPS code: 01-46264
- GNIS feature ID: 2406084
- Website: www.malvern-al.org

Malvern is a town in Geneva County, Alabama, United States. It is part of the Dothan, Alabama Metropolitan Statistical Area. As of the 2020 census, Malvern had a population of 1,536.

== Geography ==
According to the U.S. Census Bureau, the town has a total area of 14.0 square miles (36 km^{2}), all land.

== Demographics ==
Historical population
Census	Pop.	Note	%±
1910	173		—
1920	221		27.7%
1930	207		−6.3%
1940	190		−8.2%
1950	196		3.2%
1960	213		8.7%
1970	227		6.6%
1980	558		145.8%
1990	570		2.2%
2000	1,215		113.2%
2010	1,448		19.2%
2020	1,536		6.1%
U.S. Decennial Census; 2013 Estimate

According to the 1910 U.S. Census, Malvern was incorporated in 1904.

=== 2020 census ===
As of the 2020 census, Malvern had a population of 1,536. The median age was 41.8 years. 24.0% of residents were under the age of 18 and 18.6% of residents were 65 years of age or older. For every 100 females there were 93.7 males, and for every 100 females age 18 and over there were 90.2 males age 18 and over.

1.0% of residents lived in urban areas, while 99.0% lived in rural areas.

There were 583 households in Malvern, including 407 family households, of which 31.6% had children under the age of 18 living in them. Of all households, 53.7% were married-couple households, 15.4% were households with a male householder and no spouse or partner present, and 24.7% were households with a female householder and no spouse or partner present. About 23.1% of all households were made up of individuals and 8.1% had someone living alone who was 65 years of age or older.

There were 651 housing units, of which 10.4% were vacant. The homeowner vacancy rate was 0.2% and the rental vacancy rate was 9.5%.

Malvern racial composition
Race	Num.	Perc.
White (non-Hispanic)	1,297	84.44%
Black or African American (non-Hispanic)	82	5.34%
Native American	7	0.46%
Asian	2	0.13%
Pacific Islander	2	0.13%
Other/Mixed	79	5.14%
Hispanic or Latino	67	4.36%

=== 2010 census ===
As of the census of 2010, there were 1,448 people, 582 households, and 428 families residing in the town. The population density was 103.4 inhabitants per square mile (39.9/km^{2}). There were 647 housing units at an average density of 46.2 per square mile (17.8/km^{2}). The racial makeup of the town was 91.2% White, 4.8% Black or African American, .7% Native American, 0.1% Asian, 1.7% from other races, and 1.5% from two or more races. 4.8% of the population were Hispanic or Latino of any race.

There were 485 households, out of which 29.4% had children under the age of 18 living with them, 58.2% were married couples living together, 11.9% had a female householder with no husband present, and 26.5% were non-families. 22.7% of all households were made up of individuals, and 10.8% had someone living alone who was 65 years of age or older. The average household size was 2.49 and the average family size was 2.92.

In the town, the population was spread out, with 22.8% under the age of 18, 8.8% from 18 to 24, 24.9% from 25 to 44, 29.1% from 45 to 64, and 14.4% who were 65 years of age or older. The median age was 40.3 years. For every 100 females, there were 96.2 males. For every 100 females age 18 and over, there were 93.8 males.

The median income for a household in the town was $42,930, and the median income for a family was $41,793. Males had a median income of $40,875 versus $35,486 for females. The per capita income for the town was $21,417. About 9.6% of families and 11.1% of the population were below the poverty line, including 13.8% of those under age 18 and 6.9% of those age 65 or over.

=== 2000 census ===
As of the census of 2000, there were 1,215 people, 485 households, and 370 families residing in the town. The population density was 86.7 inhabitants per square mile (33.5/km^{2}). There were 547 housing units at an average density of 39.0 per square mile (15.1/km^{2}). The racial makeup of the town was 94.57% White, 2.22% Black or African American, 1.15% Native American, 0.25% Asian, 1.07% from other races, and 0.74% from two or more races. 1.32% of the population were Hispanic or Latino of any race.

There were 485 households, out of which 36.1% had children under the age of 18 living with them, 60.2% were married couples living together, 11.5% had a female householder with no husband present, and 23.7% were non-families. 21.0% of all households were made up of individuals, and 7.6% had someone living alone who was 65 years of age or older. The average household size was 2.51 and the average family size was 2.89.

In the town, the population was spread out, with 26.1% under the age of 18, 6.7% from 18 to 24, 31.4% from 25 to 44, 24.6% from 45 to 64, and 11.2% who were 65 years of age or older. The median age was 36 years. For every 100 females, there were 97.9 males. For every 100 females age 18 and over, there were 93.1 males.

The median income for a household in the town was $31,850, and the median income for a family was $37,813. Males had a median income of $29,701 versus $19,500 for females. The per capita income for the town was $15,283. About 12.1% of families and 14.3% of the population were below the poverty line, including 18.8% of those under age 18 and 23.3% of those age 65 or over.
