= China Grove, Alabama =

- Unincorporated community
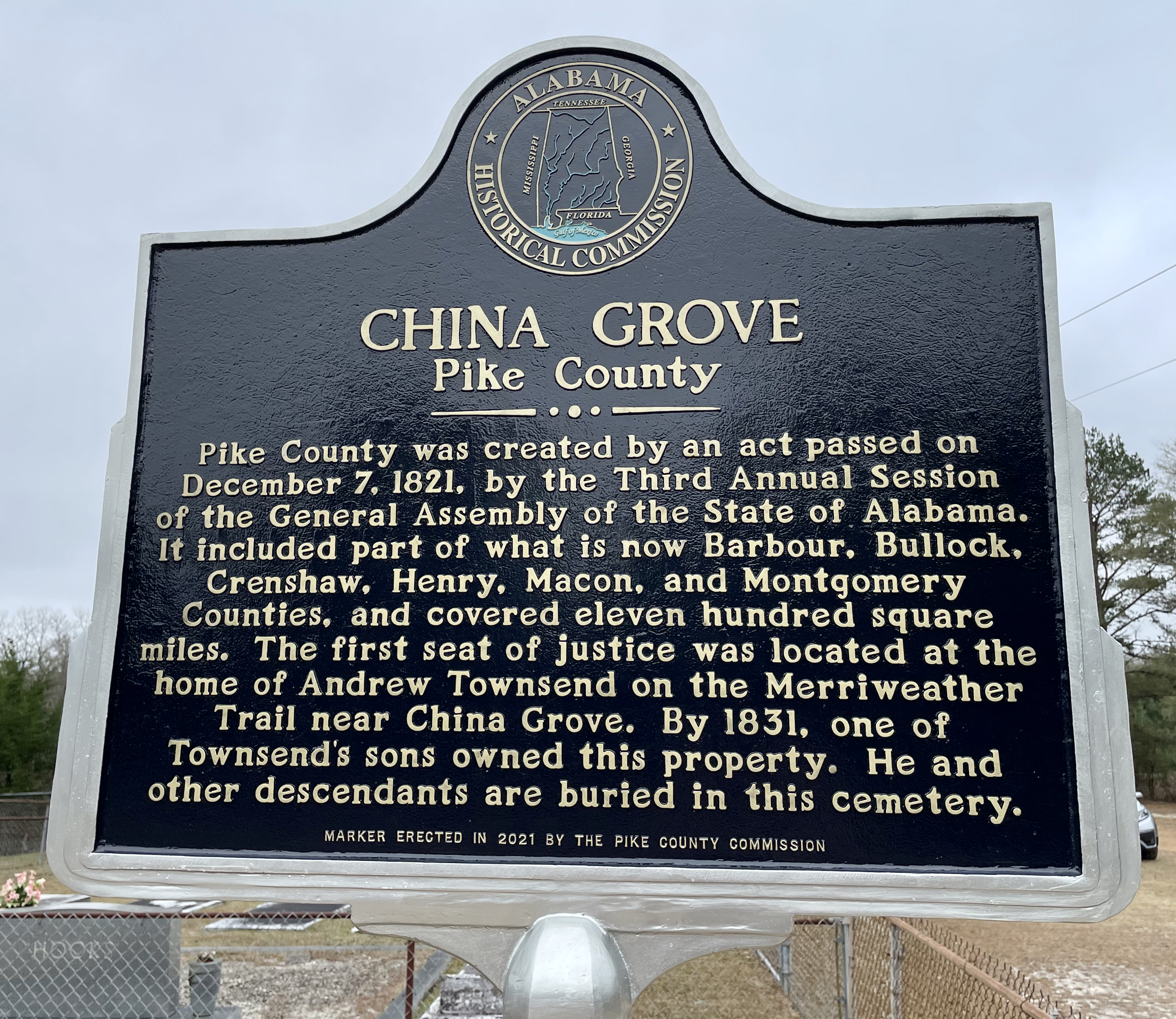
- Historical marker describing the settlement of China Grove.

- Location within Alabama Location within the United States
- Coordinates: 32°01′47″N 85°56′41″W
- Country: United States
- State: Alabama
- County: Pike
- Elevation: 528 ft (161 m)
- Time zone: UTC-6 (Central (CST))
  - Summer (DST): UTC-5 (CDT)
- Area code: 334
- GNIS feature ID: 164039

China Grove is an unincorporated community in Pike County, Alabama, United States, located 15 miles (24 km) north of Troy.

== History ==
The community is likely named after local chinaberry trees. A post office operated under the name China Grove from 1830 to 1905. China Grove was one of the first settled areas in Pike County.
