= Whitewater Creek (Chattahoochee River tributary) =

Stream in Heard and Troup County, Georgia, U.S.

Coordinates: 33°03′07″N 85°09′17″W

Whitewater Creek is a stream in Heard and Troup counties in the U.S. state of Georgia. It is a tributary to the Chattahoochee River within the waters of West Point Lake.

Whitewater Creek's name is an accurate preservation of its native Creek language name Wehutkee, meaning "white water". Variant names are "Hatchesoofkee Creek", "Wehutkee Creek", and "White Water Creek".
