= 2022 Pembroke–Black Creek tornado =

EF4 tornado in Georgia (U.S. State)

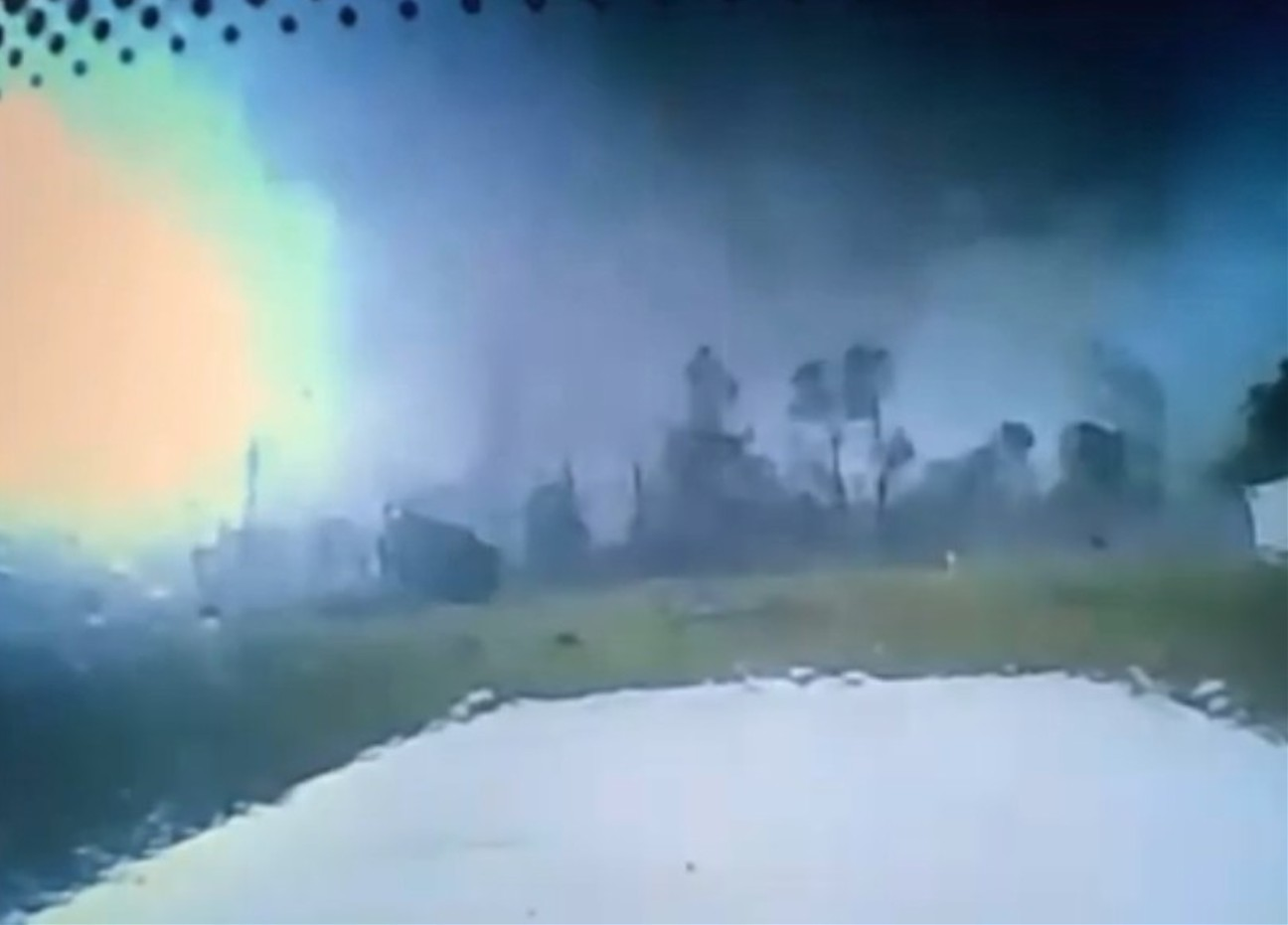
- A security still of the tornado near Ellabell.

Meteorological history
- Formed: April 5, 2022, 5:18 p.m. EDT (UTC−04:00)
- Dissipated: April 5, 2022, 5:33 p.m. EDT (UTC−04:00)
- Duration: 15 minutes

EF4 tornado
- on the Enhanced Fujita scale
- Max width: 1,300 yards (0.74 mi; 1.2 km)
- Path length: 14.39 miles (23.16 km)
- Highest winds: 185 mph (298 km/h)

Overall effects
- Fatalities: 1
- Injuries: 12
- Damage: $30 million (2022 USD)
- Areas affected: Bryan County, Specifically Pembroke and Black Creek, Georgia
- Part of the tornado outbreak sequence of April 4–7, 2022 and tornado outbreaks of 2022

On the afternoon of April 5, 2022, amid a tornado outbreak across the Southeastern United States, a large and violent tornado struck the city of Pembroke and the community of Black Creek, Georgia. The National Weather Service forecast office in Charleston, South Carolina, rated the worst of the damage from the tornado EF4 on the Enhanced Fujita scale with winds estimated at 185 miles per hour (298 km/h), which made this strongest tornado in the United States in 2022. The tornado killed one person, injured 12 others, and caused $17 million in damage.

== Meteorological synopsis ==
During the morning of April 5, a quasi-linear convective system (QLCS), commonly known as a squall line, moved across Georgia. The QLCS was being propelled by a mid-atmospheric shortwave ahead of a cold front. Mixed layer convective available potential energy across Georgia was as high as 1,500–2,000 J/kg, with dew points in the mid-60s °F. As the QLCS was moving across Georgia, a few discrete supercells formed and became particularly robust, owing to strong wind shear and storm relative helicity values exceeding 300 m^{2}/s^{2}. One of these supercells eventually produced the Pembroke–Black Creek tornado.

== Tornado summary ==
The tornado formed south of Bacontown Road just southwest of Pembroke in Bryan County at 5:18 p.m. EDT (21:18 UTC). It quickly strengthened as it moved northeastward with a multi-vortex structure that lacked a condensation funnel, snapping or uprooting dozens of trees. The tornado then moved into Pembroke and reached EF2 intensity as it entered the downtown area. Along College Street (SR 67), the tornado inflicted significant damage to the Bryan County Courthouse, which had many windows blown out and lost a large portion of its roof. The Bryan County Jail was also damaged and fencing around the facility was destroyed. The Bryan County Planning and Zoning office was partially unroofed and also sustained some collapse of exterior walls. The Bryan County Administrative Complex, located near the courthouse and jail, also suffered major structural damage. A couple of older wood-frame homes were destroyed along South Main Street (SR 119), multiple other structures and several vehicles in town were damaged, including some that were flipped over, and many trees and power lines were downed. Moving east-northeast, the tornado crossed US 280 and exited the town. It maintained EF2 intensity as it crossed over a wooded, marshy area, flattening a swath of trees while also destroying an outbuilding along C C Road and heavily damaging a house on Stubbs Farm Road.

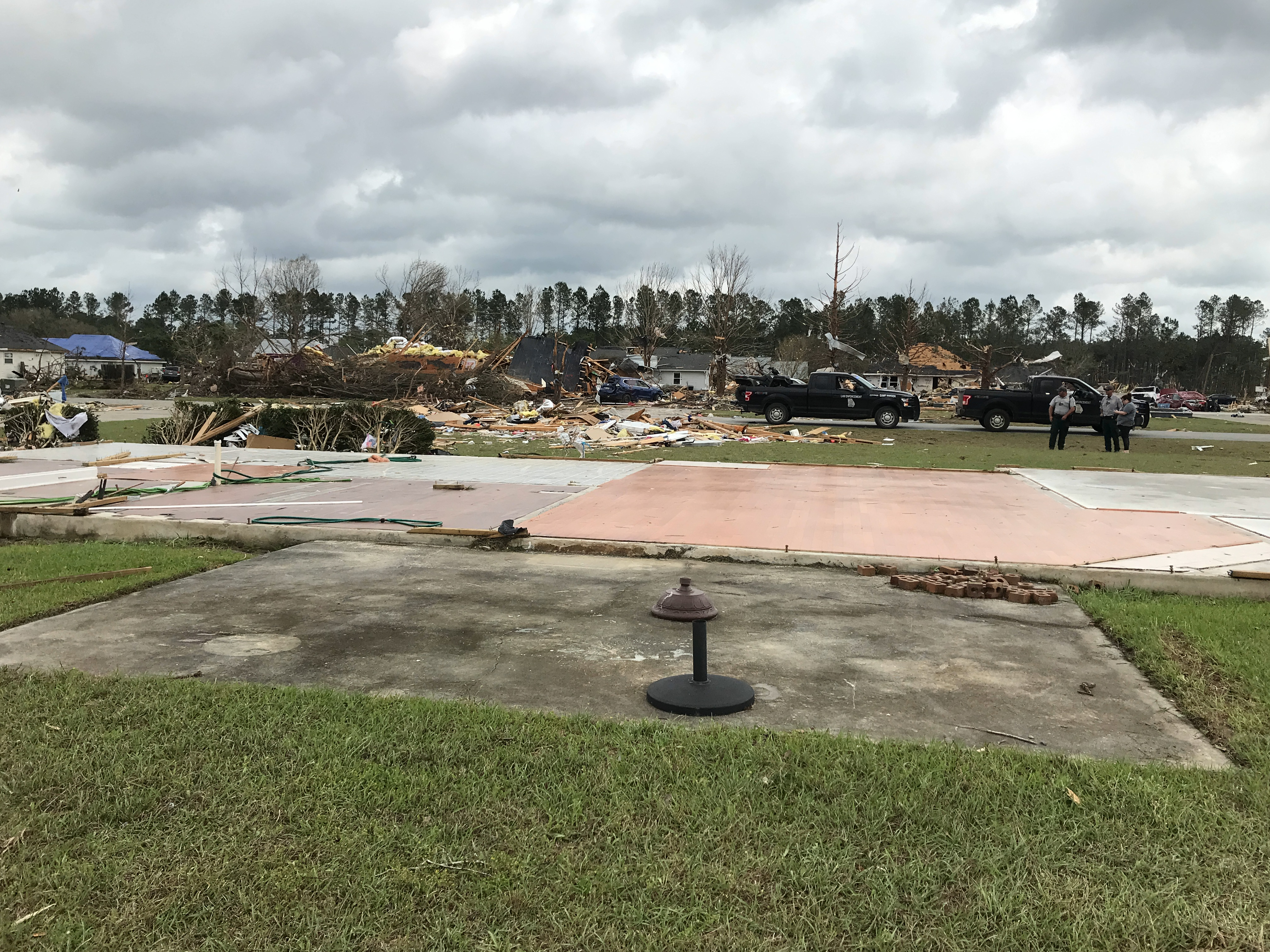
A well-anchored home that was swept clean from its foundation at EF4 intensity in Black Creek.

After moving north of Ellabell and entering the small community of Black Creek, the tornado rapidly strengthened to EF3 intensity as it moved into George D. Hendrix Park before becoming a violent EF4 wedge tornado as it moved through it. A large recreation center building was heavily damaged at this location, sustaining roof loss and collapse of exterior walls, with portions of its metal framing being twisted. Reinforced concrete light poles were snapped at the base, multiple large trees were snapped, denuded, and partially debarked, and turf at a football field in the park was also damaged. The tornado then grew to its peak width of about 3/4 mile (1.2 km) and reached its peak intensity of mid-range EF4 as it struck the Park Place subdivision. Several well-built homes here were destroyed, four of which were leveled, including two that were completely swept away with only their bare concrete slab foundations remaining. Multiple other homes sustained major damage in the Park Place subdivision, some of which had roofs and exterior walls ripped off. Cars were tossed and damaged, and a large portion of the roof from the recreation center at George D. Hendrix Park landed on a house in this area, approximately 500–600 yards (460–550 m) away from where it originated. Several people were left trapped under the rubble of their damaged or destroyed homes and had to be extracted by rescue crews. No fatalities occurred in the Park Place subdivision, though there were multiple serious injuries.

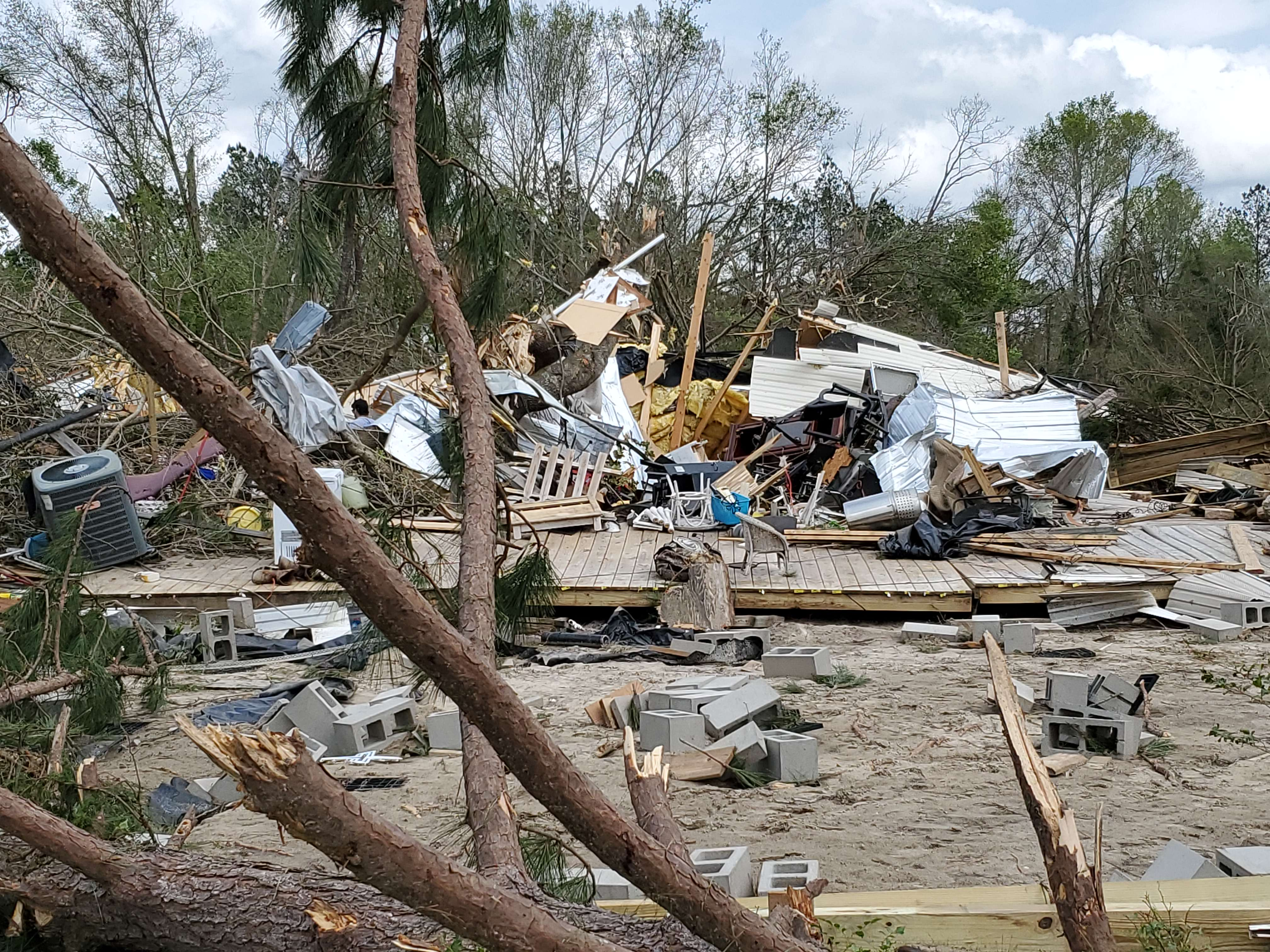
A mobile home that was destroyed by the tornado. A fatality occurred at this location.

The violent tornado then crossed over Wilma Edwards Road onto the Black Creek Golf Course, where many trees were snapped and partially debarked, a golf cart barn was destroyed, and a clubhouse building sustained severe structural damage. Around the golf course, the tornado reportedly changed the landscape, including a hole it created that was big enough for a pickup truck to fit inside. Some homes at the golf course on Worthington Drive, Wembly Court, and Wellington Court were impacted by the southern edge of the circulation and sustained considerable roof and exterior damage. A man who was at the golf course attempted to take shelter in a clubhouse along Worthington Drive, but the doors were locked. He recorded a video of the tornado as it just barely missed the structure; it showed numerous trees falling down, and the moment when a portion of the roof was ripped off the structure as he stood outside. The man was not injured, and his video went viral. The tornado then weakened to EF3 strength as it moved further to the east-northeast, mowing down more trees as it moved through another wooded and marshy area. It then crossed over McCown Lane and Olive Branch Road before striking a mobile home park along the southern end of Homestead Drive at EF3 intensity. Several well-anchored mobile homes were destroyed after being thrown or rolled. Some outbuildings were destroyed, and storage trailers were overturned as well. A 66-year-old woman was killed in one of the destroyed mobile homes, and multiple injuries occurred throughout this area.

The tornado then began to quickly weaken and narrow as it crossed I-16 at the US 280 exit; several videos showed the tornado crossing the interstate. Along the east side of the interstate, the tornado caused EF1 damage to some large warehouses, ripped part of the roof off a AGCO company building at Oracal Parkway Circle, and inflicted considerable damage to trees. It then dissipated after crossing the road at 5:33 p.m. EDT (21:33 UTC), having traveled 14.39 miles (23.16 km). In addition to the fatality, at least 12 people were injured. Coupled with the EF4 tornado that struck Newnan the previous year, this event marked the first time that F4/EF4 tornadoes had struck Georgia in back-to-back years since modern records began in 1950.

== Aftermath ==
Following the tornado, the Bryan County Commissioners declared a state of emergency in Pembroke. As a result of the state of emergency, a curfew between was established overnight, which prohibited people from trespassing around the tornado disaster area. On April 5, the American Red Cross established a shelter in Pembroke. Search and rescue teams from numerous neighboring towns came to aid in sweeping the area for injuries and aiding victims. Within 24 hours, the Bryan County Board had received $58,000 in donations and aid. The tornado caused the largest insurance claim in the history of Bryan County, with insurance claims reaching $17 million. In March 2024, the Bryan County Board of Commissioners approved the restoration of the Hendrix Park gymnasium, which had been heavily damaged. In April 2024, the Bryan County Board of Commissioners agreed to pay $4.7 million to rebuild the Hendrix Park gymnasium. In July 2024, the Bryan County Commissioners approved the installation of 15 new emergency warning sirens for Bryan County.

== See also ==
- Weather of 2022
- List of North American tornadoes and tornado outbreaks
- List of F4 and EF4 tornadoes
  - List of F4 and EF4 tornadoes (2020–present)
- List of United States tornadoes in April 2022
