= RHHS =

RHHS may refer to:

- Randolph-Henry High School, Charlotte Court House, Virginia
- Ribston Hall High School, Gloucestershire, UK
- Richmond Hill High School (disambiguation), several schools
  - Richmond Hill High School (Georgia), in Richmond Hill
  - Richmond Hill High School (Ontario), in Richmond Hill
  - Richmond Hill High School (Queens), in New York
- Ridgeland-Hardeeville High School
- River Hill High School, Clarksville, Maryland
- Rockwall Heath High School, Heath, Texas
- Rock Hill High School (disambiguation), several schools
  - Rock Hill High School, Ohio
  - Rock Hill High School, Rock Hill, South Carolina
- Rocky Hill High School, Rocky Hill, Connecticut

== See also ==
- RHH (disambiguation)
