= Tornado outbreak of April 4–7, 2022 =

Tornadoes in the Southeastern U.S.

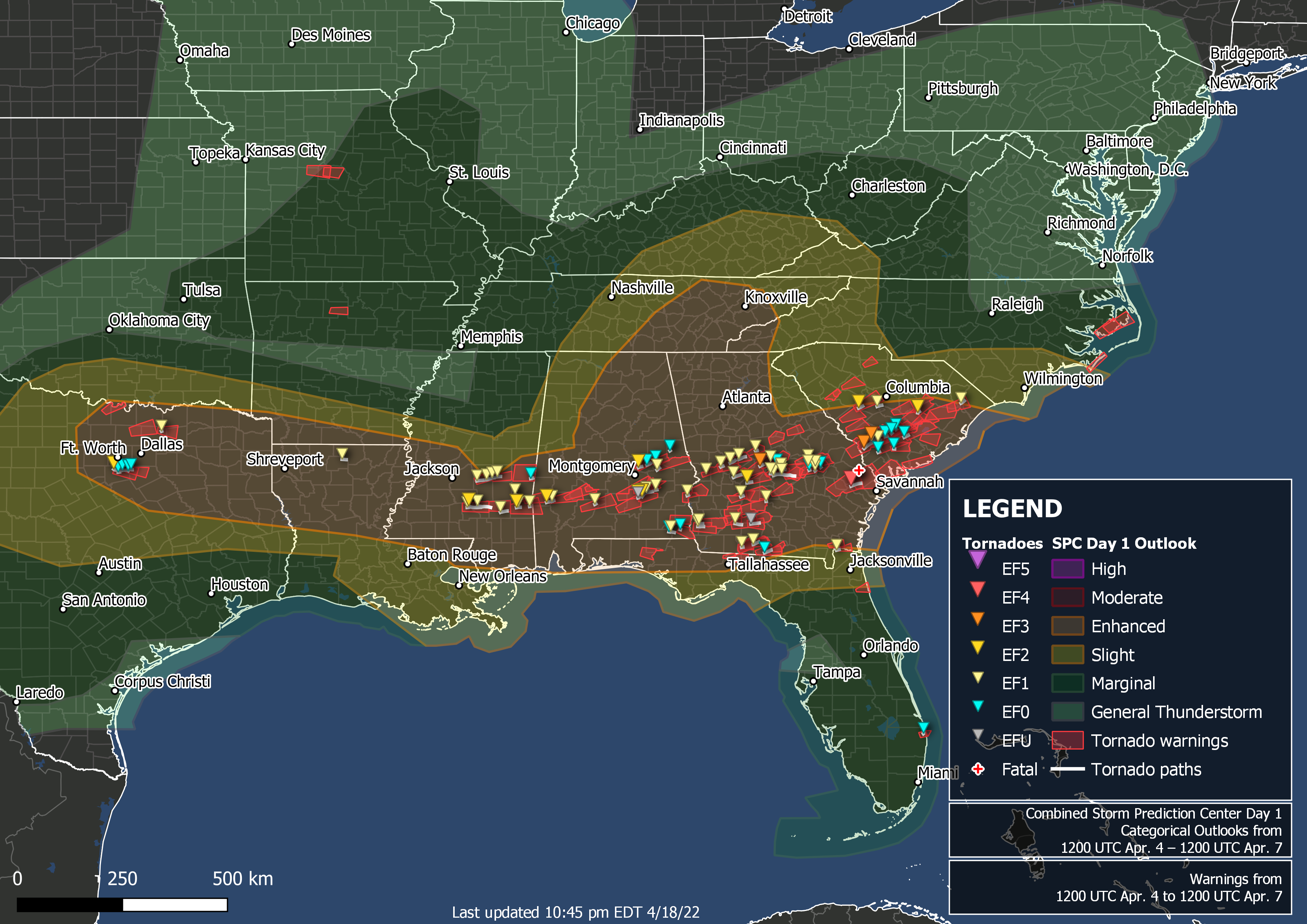
- Confirmed tornadoes and tornado warnings on April 4–6

Meteorological history
- Duration: April 4–7, 2022

Tornado outbreak
- Tornadoes: 89
- Max. rating: EF4 tornado
- Duration: 55 hours, 19 minutes
- Highest winds: Tornadic – 185 mph (298 km/h) (Black Creek, Georgia EF4 on April 5)
- Highest gusts: Non-tornadic – 100 mph (160 km/h) (Whitehouse, Texas downburst on April 5)
- Largest hail: 2.75 in (7.0 cm) in multiple locations

Overall effects
- Fatalities: 1 (+2 non-tornadic)
- Injuries: 17+ injuries
- Damage: $1.3 billion (2022 USD)
- Areas affected: Southern United States, Midwestern United States, Eastern United States
- Part of the tornado outbreaks of 2022

From April 4–7, 2022, a major tornado outbreak occurred within the Southeastern United States, producing numerous strong to violent tornadoes. The outbreak capped off an extremely active period of tornado activity for the Southeast, following two separate outbreaks during the second half of March.

On April 4, the Storm Prediction Center (SPC) issued an enhanced risk for severe thunderstorms from Texas to Mississippi. That afternoon, a mesoscale convective system and numerous discrete supercells produced a swath of severe weather and several tornadoes in the Southeastern United States, including several strong, long tracked tornadoes. Several tornadoes were confirmed around the Dallas–Fort Worth metroplex late on April 4, including an EF2 tornado that damaged multiple homes and injured one person near Egan. As the line progressed eastward, numerous tornadoes occurred across Mississippi, Alabama, Georgia, and South Carolina spawned by embedded circulations and supercell thunderstorms that formed within the squall line. An EF3 tornado damaged or destroyed several homes in Bonaire, Georgia while a large EF3 tornado prompted a tornado emergency for Allendale and Sycamore, South Carolina. A violent EF4 tornado in Black Creek, Georgia resulted in one fatality as it destroyed several neighborhoods, and another large EF3 tornado caused widespread heavy tree damage northeast of Ulmer, South Carolina.

More severe storms occurred across a large portion of the Southeast ahead of a cold front on April 6–7, with more tornadoes reported in South and Central Georgia and further south into Florida, all of which were weak. Along with the one tornadic death, trees felled by straight-line winds killed one person each in Louisiana and Texas. In all, 89 tornadoes were confirmed as a result of this outbreak, along with one tornadic fatality, two non-tornadic fatalities, and at least 16 injuries.

== Meteorological synopsis ==
=== April 4–5 ===
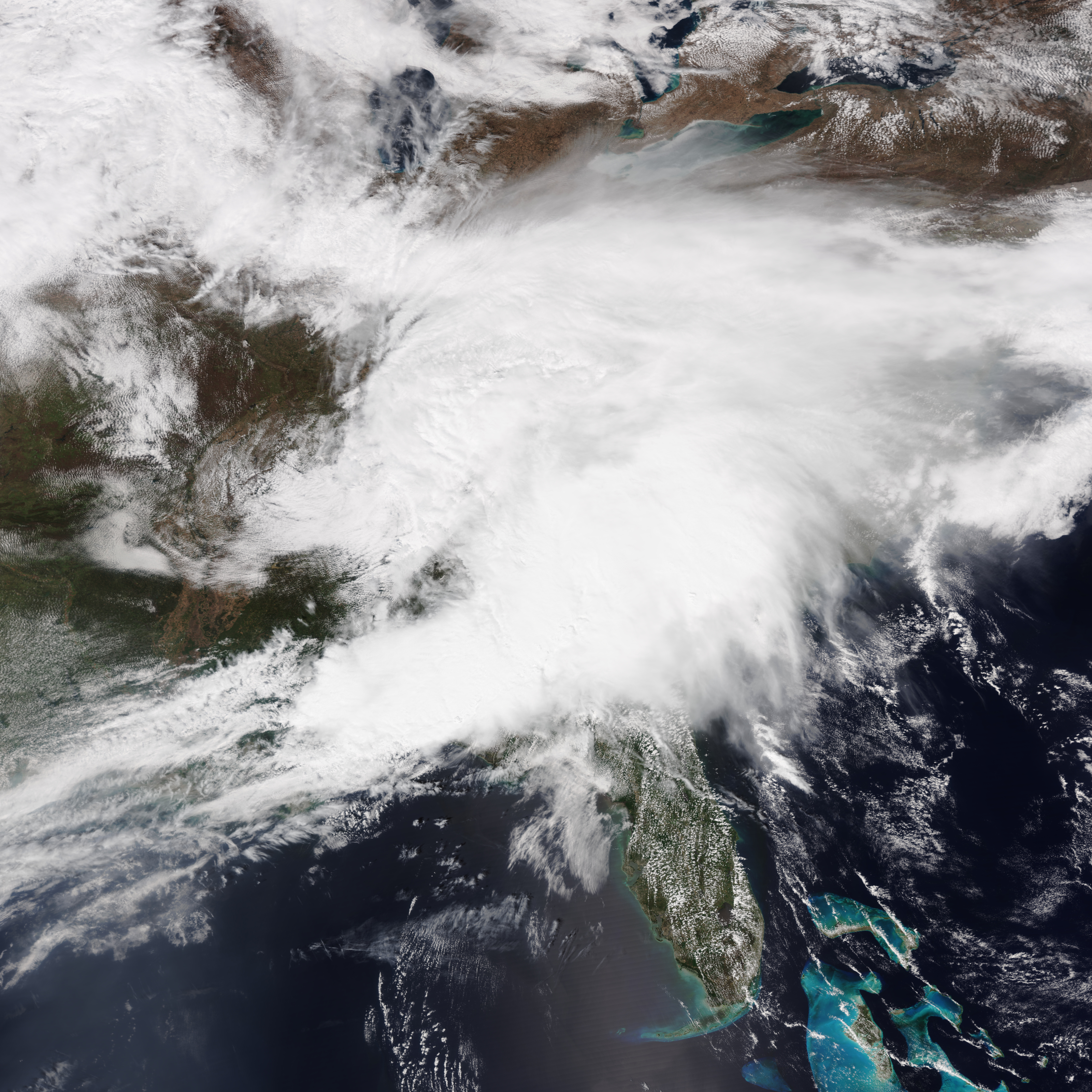
Satellite imagery of the severe storm system on April 5.

For the third time in a three-week period, environmental conditions across the Southeastern United States became favorable for a widespread severe weather and tornado outbreak during the early days of April. For days, forecasters at the Storm Prediction Center advertised the eastward progression of a broad upper-level trough into the South Plains region. As this occurred, they forecasted the development of an area of low pressure in northwestern Texas along a stalled front. To the south of this northward-propagating boundary, surface temperatures rose to around 80 °F (27 °C) while rapidly-cooling air aloft led to the development of 1,500–2,000 J/kg mid-level convective available potential energy (CAPE). With modest advection of warm air and an eroding capping inversion, widespread convective development overspread northwestern Texas and southwestern Oklahoma, with a primary risk of very large hail and damaging wind gusts. Farther southeast in the vicinity of the Dallas–Fort Worth metroplex, forecasters warned of the potential for a higher tornadic threat given an approaching shortwave trough, better northward transport of moisture, and a strengthening of low-level wind fields. A long-lived embedded supercell developed south of the metroplex, producing multiple tornadoes. One of tornadoes reached EF2 intensity near Egan, causing severe damage and injuring one person. Otherwise, widespread convective activity congealed into a southeast-moving mesoscale convective system across eastern Texas and Louisiana through the overnight hours, where the SPC had placed a level 3 Enhanced risk for the threat of damaging winds. Dozens of severe wind gusts were recorded.

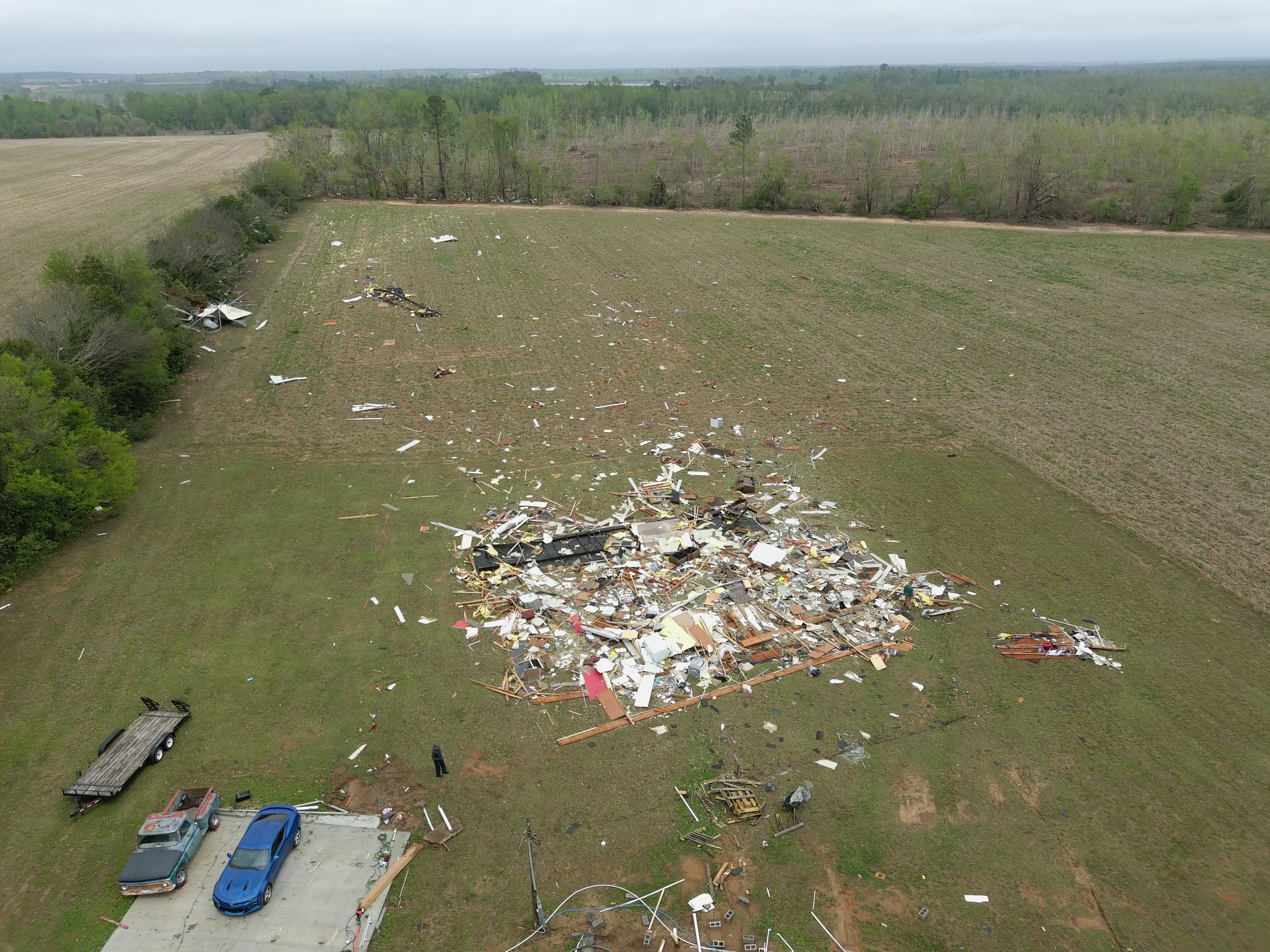
A mobile home that was completely destroyed by a low-end EF3 tornado south of Allendale, South Carolina.

Into the morning hours, the progressive squall line lost some of its intensity as it moved across the Ark-La-Tex region. However, with increasing wind fields and deeply moist dew points above 70 °F (21 °C), the SPC anticipated re-intensification of this feature through the afternoon, plus an attendant risk for discrete supercells in advance of the line. Accordingly, they yet again outlined a level 3/Enhanced risk of severe weather, including a more substantial threat for tornadoes, some EF2 or stronger, from the Mississippi–Alabama border eastward to the coastal border of Georgia and South Carolina. Despite only modest mid-level cooling, the environment became increasingly unstable as temperatures warmed in excess of 70 °F (21 °C), resulting in mid-level CAPE into the 500–1,500 J/kg range. A bowing complex evolved across southern Alabama into Georgia while leading supercells evolved in advance of the line, resulting in widespread damaging winds and numerous tornadoes, including multiple strong tornadoes. One high-end EF3 tornado embedded within the line destroyed multiple homes in Bonaire, Georgia, causing an injury. Farther northeast across South Carolina, a south-southwesterly low-level jet up to 50 kn (60 mph; 95 km/h) overspread an unstable and moist environment, leading to the concern for supercells capable of producing strong tornadoes. Indeed, multiple discrete storms developed ahead of the advancing squall line in the warm sector across eastern Georgia and the South Carolina Lowcountry. These cells quickly intensified as they overspread the region, and produced multiple significant tornadoes, including multiple long-track, strong wedge tornadoes. A low-end EF3 tornado prompted the issuance of a tornado emergency for Allendale, South Carolina, while a violent EF4 tornado destroyed numerous homes and caused a fatality in Black Creek, Georgia. A high-end EF3 tornado then touched down in Allendale County near Ulmer a few hours later, before continuing into Bamberg and Orangeburg counties, causing substantial tree damage along its path. An EF2 tornado also inflicted heavy damage along in the western, northwestern, and northern parts of Manning, South Carolina. By the evening hours, these cells began to merge with the progressive squall line as it shifted into a more stable air mass and approached the Atlantic coastline.

=== April 6–7 ===
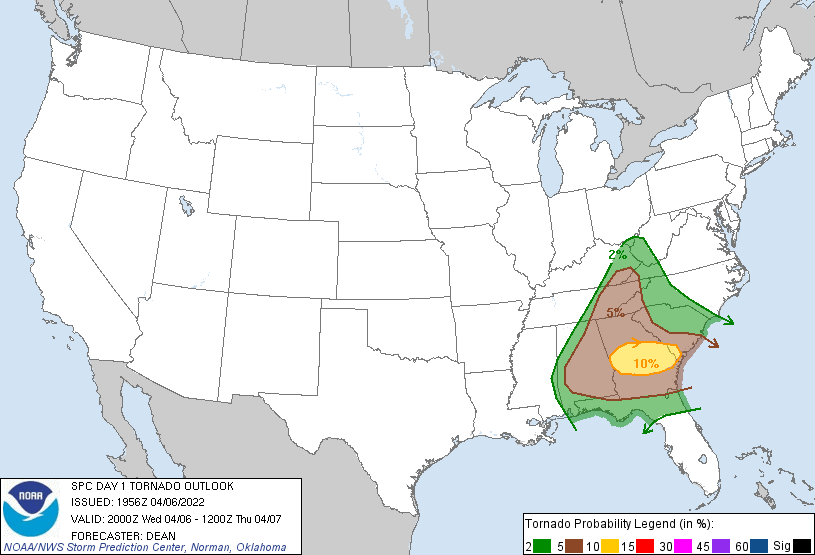
Storm Prediction Center tornado probability for April 6, showing a 10% risk area for tornadoes.

After the previous days' storms advanced into the Atlantic Ocean, a new severe weather system developed over many of the same areas in Alabama, Georgia, and South Carolina. Remnants of storms from the previous day gave way for abundant moisture overspreading the area. This, combined with the presence of upper 60s F dew points and CAPE values of 2000-3000 J/kg, created a highly unstable atmosphere, conductive for severe weather. Given the favorable parameters for severe weather, the Storm Prediction Center issued a large Enhanced risk area, encompassing areas centered around Georgia, central and northeastern portions of Alabama, eastern Tennessee, extreme western North Carolina, and southern South Carolina. The outlook highlighted the high probabilities of damaging wind gusts to be the primary threat of the event, but a 10%, unhatched corridor for tornadoes was also situated along central Georgia.

As the evening advanced, destabilization in the area kept growing, and a long chain of thunderstorms developed along a corridor in central and southern Georgia. As such, the SPC issued a large tornado watch for central counties in Georgia, discussing the moderate possibilities for tornadoes to develop, but strong tornadoes were not thought to be likely. As this line segmented on the early evening, multiple supercell thunderstorms developed and matured on the area as they entered the favorable environment in central Georgia. As such, multiple tornadoes developed as a result. An EF1 tornado that developed in Lee County was documented by multiple storm chasers as it caused damage near the town of Cordele. Multiple other weak tornadoes were reported from these supercells along with numerous reports of damaging winds. More severe storms formed in Florida and the Eastern Carolinas during the afternoon of April 7, but no tornadoes were reported. The severe threat ended after the storms either moved offshore or weakened below severe limits.

== Confirmed tornadoes ==
Confirmed tornadoes by Enhanced Fujita rating
EFU	EF0	EF1	EF2	EF3	EF4	EF5	Total
2	26	47	10	3	1	0	89

=== Pembroke–Ellabell–Black Creek, Georgia ===
Pembroke–Ellabell–Black Creek, Georgia
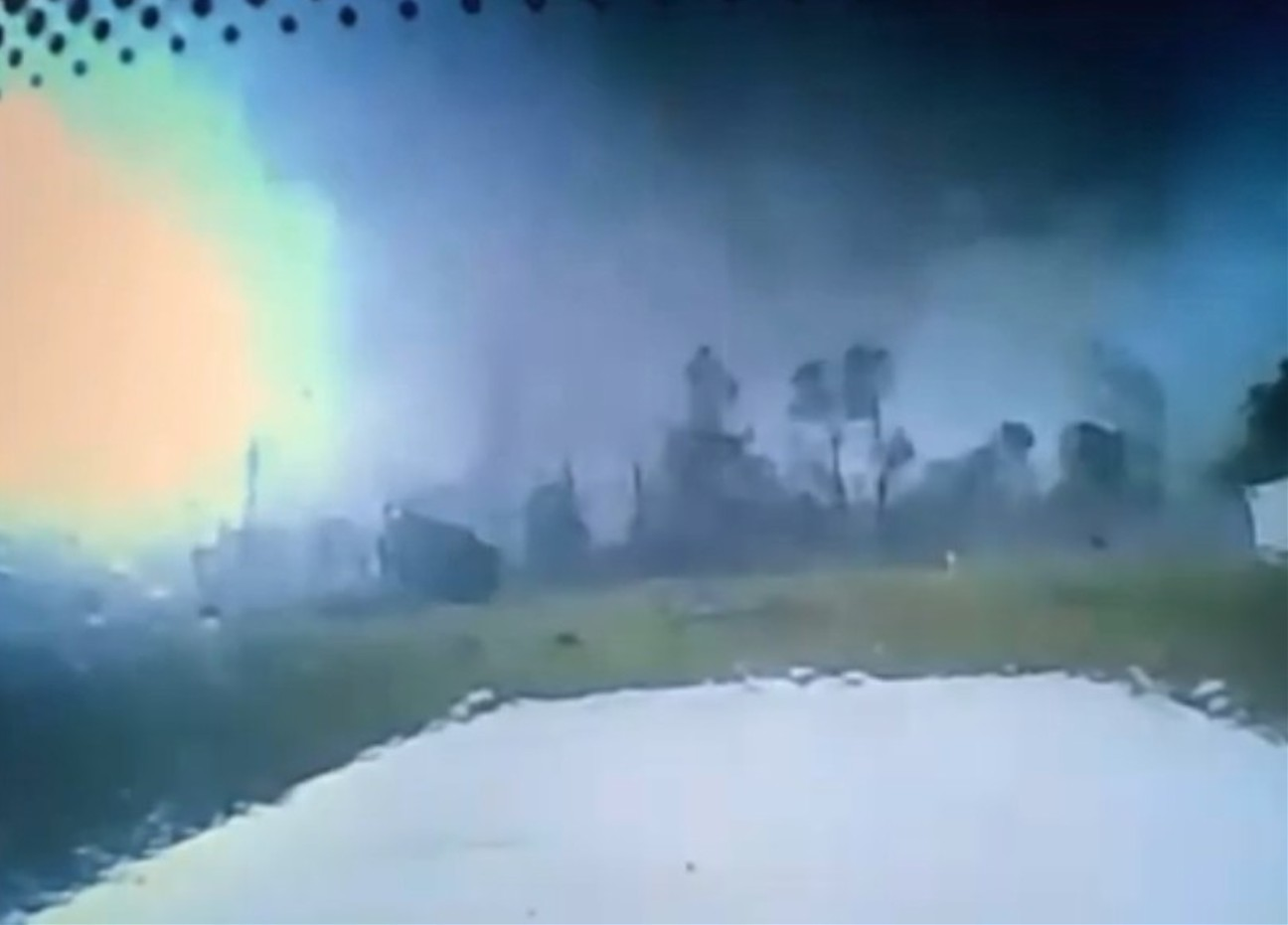
- A security still of the tornado in Ellabell.

Meteorological history
- Formed: April 5, 2022, 5:18 p.m. EDT (UTC−04:00)
- Dissipated: April 5, 2022, 5:33 p.m. EDT
- Duration: 15 minutes

EF4 tornado
- on the Enhanced Fujita scale
- Highest winds: 185 mph (298 km/h)

Overall effects
- Fatalities: 1
- Injuries: 12
- Damage: $17 million (2022 USD)

This large, violent wedge tornado touched down just southwest of Pembroke at 5:18 p.m. EDT (21:18 UTC) and quickly strengthened to EF2 intensity as it moved into town. It inflicting significant damage to the Bryan County Courthouse, the Bryan County Jail, the Bryan County Planning and Zoning office, destroyed a couple of older wood-frame homes, damaged multiple other structures and several vehicles, and downed many trees and power lines. Moving east-northeast, the tornado exited the town and maintained EF2 intensity as it crossed over a wooded, marshy area, flattening a swath of trees, destroying an outbuilding, and heavily damaging a house. After moving north of Ellabell and entering the small community of Black Creek, the tornado rapidly intensified and moved through George D. Hendrix Park at EF3 intensity. A large recreation center building was heavily damaged, reinforced concrete light poles were snapped, multiple large trees were snapped, denuded, and partially debarked, and turf at a football field in the park was also damaged. The tornado then grew to its peak width and reached its peak intensity of mid-range EF4 as it struck the Park Place subdivision. Several well-built homes here were destroyed, four of which were leveled, including two that were completely swept away with only their bare concrete slab foundations remaining. Multiple other homes sustained major damage, cars were tossed and damaged, and a large portion of the roof from the recreation center at George D. Hendrix Park landed on a house in this area, approximately 500–600 yards (460–550 m) away from where it originated. Multiple serious injuries occurred, some of whcich had to be rescued from their destroyed.

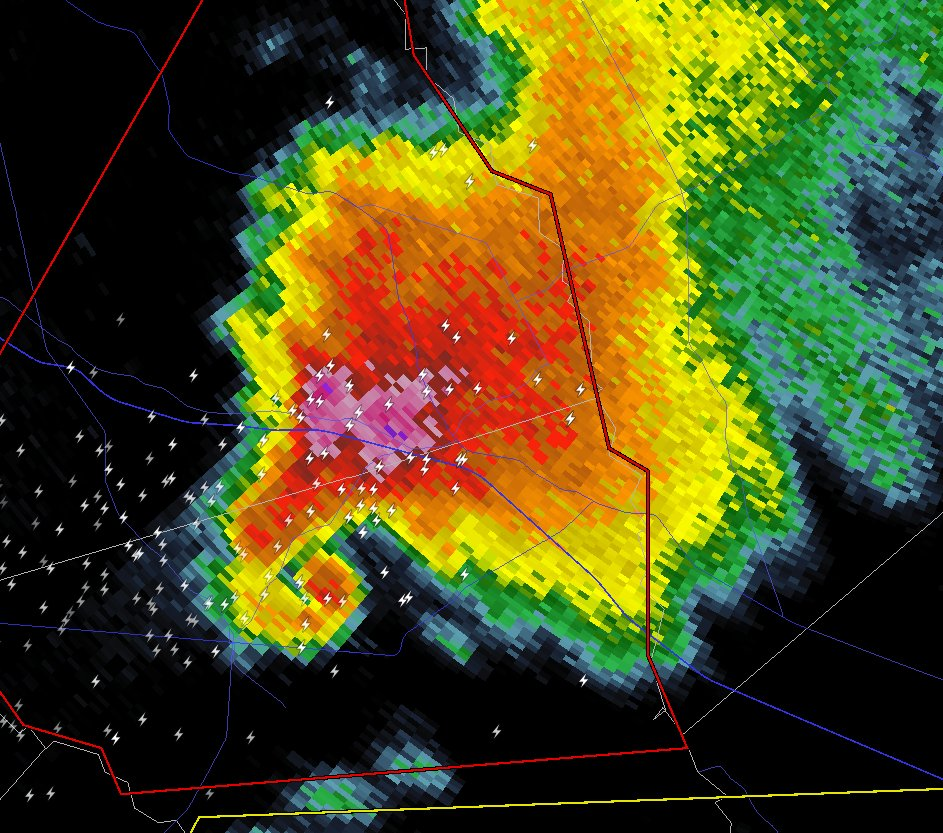
NEXRAD imagery of the tornado when it was near Black Creek

The violent tornado then moved into the Black Creek Golf Course, where many trees were snapped and partially debarked, a golf cart barn was destroyed, a clubhouse building sustained severe structural damage, and some homes sustained considerable roof and exterior damage. The tornado then weakened but remained strong as it moved further to the east-northeast, mowing down more trees as it moved through another wooded and marshy area. It then struck a mobile home park at EF3 intensity, where several well-anchored mobile homes were destroyed after being thrown or rolled. Some outbuildings were destroyed, and storage trailers were overturned as well. A woman was killed in one of the destroyed mobile homes, and multiple injuries occurred throughout this area. The tornado then weakened further as it crossed I-16 and continued eastward. The tornado caused EF1 damage to some large warehouses, ripped part of the roof off a AGCO company building, and inflicted considerable damage to trees before dissipating after crossing the road at 5:33 p.m. EDT (21:33 UTC), having traveled 14.51 miles (23.35 km).

In addition to the fatality, at least 12 people were injured. Coupled with the EF4 tornado that struck Newnan the previous year, this event marked the first time that F4/EF4 tornadoes had struck Georgia in back-to-back years since modern records began in 1950.

=== Ulmer–Bowman, South Carolina ===
Ulmer–Bowman, South Carolina
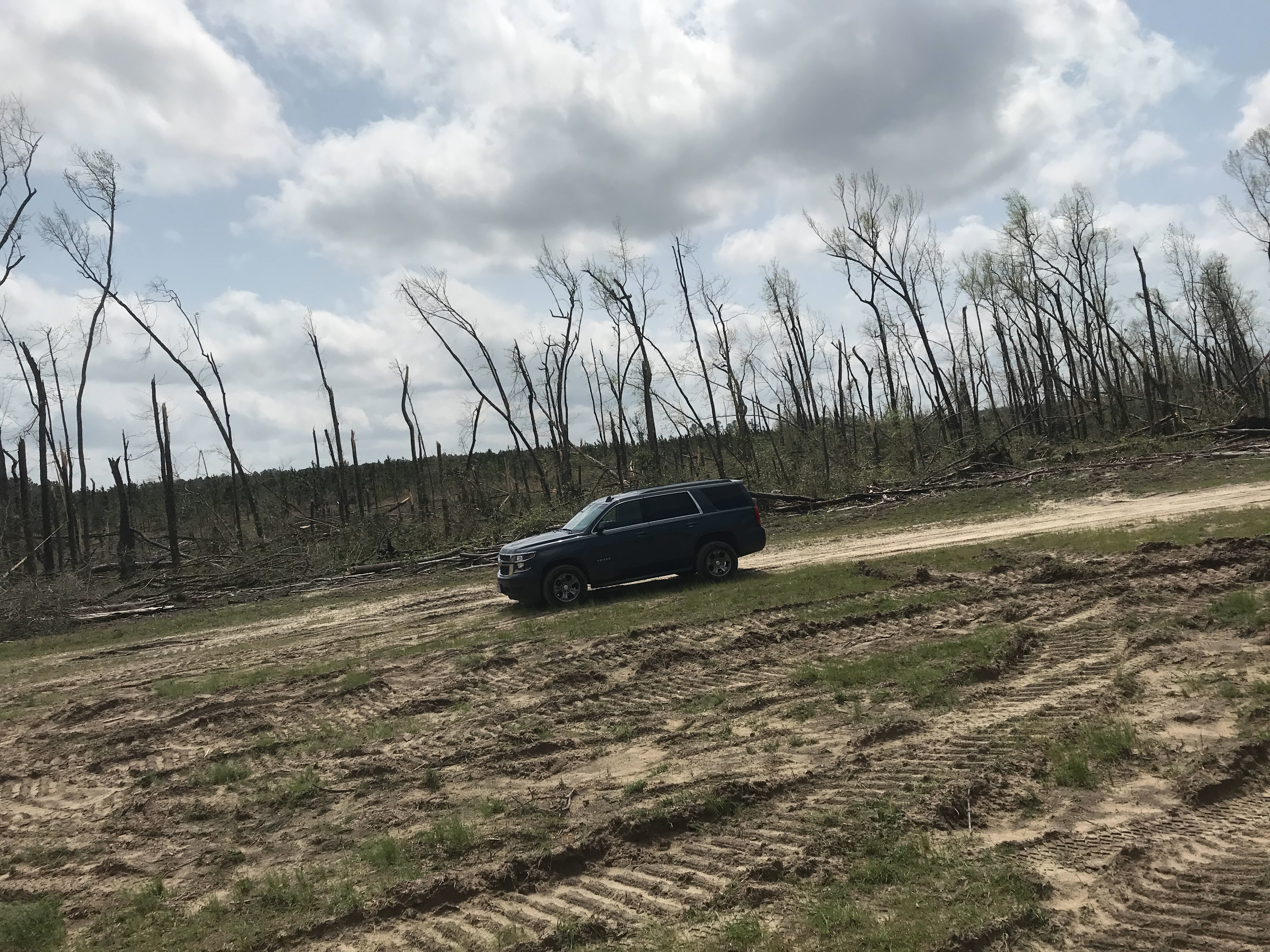
- High-end EF3 damage to hardwood trees near Ulmer

Meteorological history
- Formed: April 5, 2022, 6:03 p.m. EDT (UTC–04:00)
- Dissipated: April 5, 2022, 6:53 p.m. EDT (UTC-04:00)
- Duration: 50 minutes

EF3 tornado
- on the Enhanced Fujita scale
- Highest winds: 160 mph (260 km/h)

Overall effects
- Fatalities: 0
- Injuries: 0

This long-tracked and intense EF3 tornado first touched down in Allendale County at 6:03 p.m. EDT, just north of Highway 301 across a farm just west of Well Branch Road. Near this area, the tornado tossed a grain silo and flipped multiple farm trailers and vehicles. The tornado then continued into Bamberg County near an intersection of Highway 321 and Highway 301. In Bamberg County, the tornado through a large forest primarily consisting of softwood pine trees, with some hardwood oak trees also in some parts of the forest.

As it approached Popeye Road, the tornado strengthened into a strong EF3 with winds estimated at 160 miles per hour (260 km/h). Remarkable damage was done to both softwood and hardwood trees in this forest, with an estimated 2 miles (3.2 km) of 80-100% forest blowdown. In one section of the forest, the tornado scoured the ground and stripped pine needles off of young trees. Additionally, many younger pine trees in this area were debarked and delimbed. On either side of this were sections of pine and oak that had been snapped low, at or below 5 feet, to the ground. Numerous hardwood trees were also debarked and stripped down to large branches in Popeye Road and parts of the forest that extended northwest of Wild Flower Road. The tornado then began to weaken as it approached and crossed Alligator Road, however, the tornado also reached its peak width of 500 yards (460 m) in this area. The tornado would then strike a more residential area along Carver road. Here, one mobile home was completely destroyed, with a home having its roof completely removed and some partial wall collapses. On either side of the center of the track, other homes sustained different degrees of damage to their roofs and siding. The tornado continued northeastward and maintained EF2 strength, primarily causing damage to trees. Much of the damage on Macedonia Church Rd was from trees falling on homes.

The tornado continued to weaken as it entered Orangeburg County, and approached the North Fork of the Edisto River where numerous more hardwood trees were snapped or uprooted. The tornado also impacted some homes across Orangeburg County, causing minor damage. The tornado continued to weaken gradually as it approached Bowman, finally dissipating about 2 miles (3.2 km) north of the town.

== Non-tornadic impacts ==
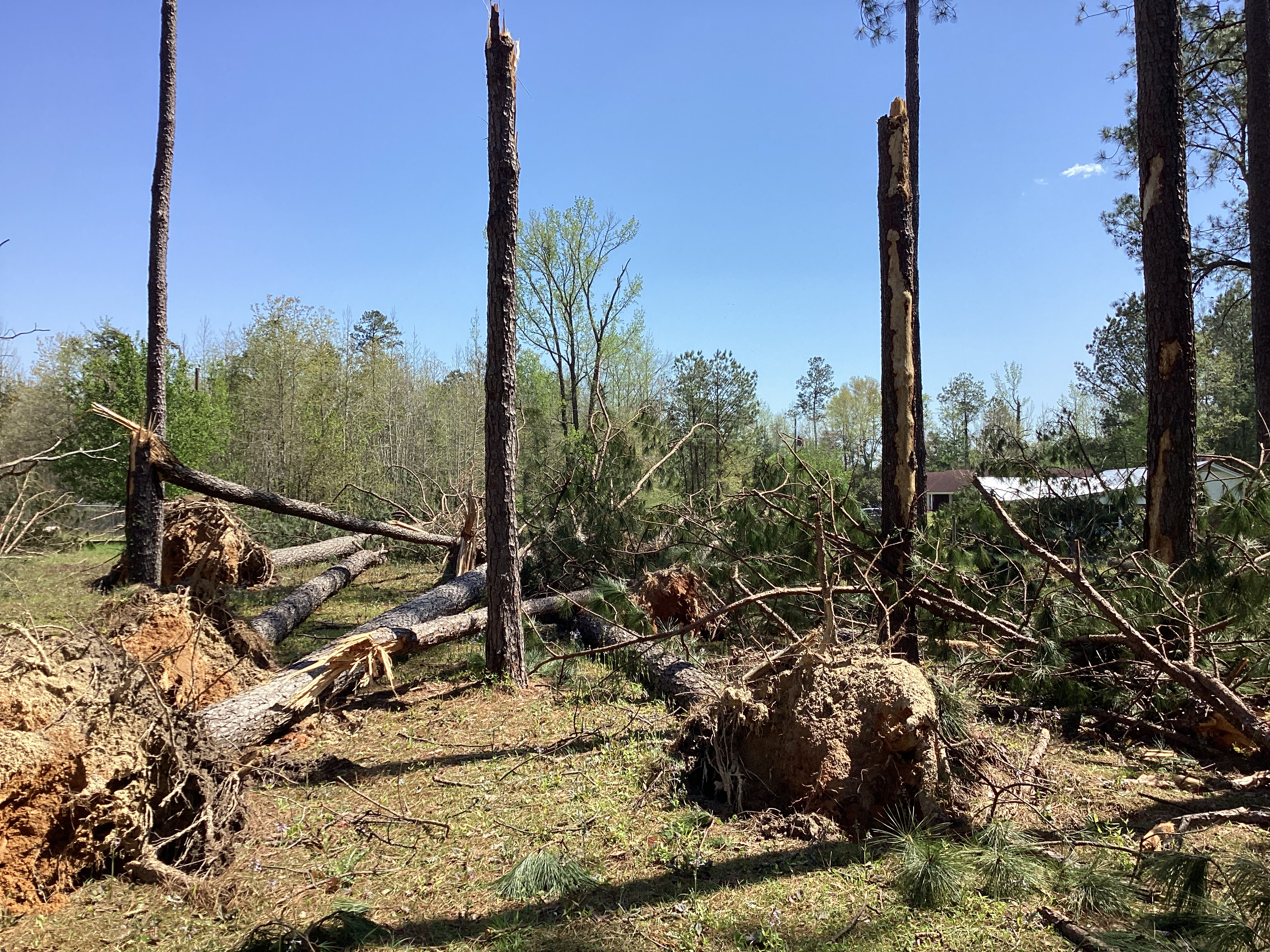
Pine trees snapped/uprooted by straight-line winds south of Beatrice, Alabama.

The severe squall line that formed in Central Texas on April 4 moved eastward, producing a swath of damaging 70–75 mph (113–121 km/h) straight line winds in Kaufman County between Scurry and Kemp. There was damage to trees and signs along with minor roof damage. Another area of even stronger winds of 75–85 mph (121–137 km/h) winds moved across southeastern Van Zandt County. Trees were damaged, metal structures/barns were damaged or destroyed, and the roofs of some homes were damaged. Another area of wind damage struck Whitehouse, knocking down numerous trees, four of which landed on homes. A fatality was confirmed in one of the houses. The severe squall line continued to produce wind damage as it moved into southern Arkansas and northern Louisiana early on April 5. Northeast of Minden, Louisiana, a motorist was killed when they struck a tree that had fallen across US 79. Although an EF1 tornado was confirmed in Union Parish, the entire southern half of the parish suffered heavy straight-line wind damage. Severe storms also formed ahead of the line, producing wind damage and large to very large hail in the central portions of Mississippi and Alabama. The squall line produced 95 mph (153 km/h) straight-line winds south of Beatrice, Alabama prior to producing an EF1 tornado to the northeast. Pine trees were snapped or uprooted due to these strong winds.

The tornadic thunderstorms that day also produced other severe weather. The storm that produced the Pembroke–Black Creek, Georgia EF4 tornado produced baseball-size (2.75 in (7.0 cm)) hail that damaged vehicles north of Ellabell. The storm was tornado warned until it moved into the Atlantic Ocean in Charleston, South Carolina, but no tornadoes were confirmed. However, severe winds downed many trees and power lines from Rincon, Georgia through Beaufort, South Carolina to Charleston. In Charleston, wind gusts of 61 and 67 mph (98 and 108 km/h) were observed in Charleston Harbor. Several aircraft on the USS Yorktown were moved, three trees at the Civil War Memorial were blown down, and the west stand of the Patriots Point Soccer Complex on Patriots Point was heavily damaged. Isolated severe storms also occurred in Missouri, northern Arkansas, and South Texas. A severe storm east of Kansas City near Pilot Grove, Missouri produced 70–80 miles per hour (110–130 km/h) winds, knocked down power lines on Route 135, and ripped part of the roof off a barn. The storm also triggered a tornado warning, but no tornadoes were confirmed. Another severe storm in northern Arkansas produced multiple instances of large hail into the overnight hours of April 5–6. The storm was also briefly tornado-warned, but no tornadoes touched down.

On April 6, a damaging windstorm struck Laurel County, Kentucky in the East Bernstadt area. Trees, power poles, and homes were damaged, the steeple of a church was blown down, and two barns collapsed. A wind gust of 75 mph (121 km/h) was also recorded in the town. Another windstorm in Beaufort, South Carolina blew down trees and power lines. Other areas of wind damage along with large hail were recorded elsewhere in the Southeastern United States as well. On April 7, severe wind gusts in the Jacksonville, Florida metropolitan area blew down trees. Large trees were also blown down in the Orlando metropolitan area and a home in the area lost a portion of its metal roof. An 82 mph (132 km/h) wind gust was also recorded at the Treasure Coast International Airport. Areas of large hail also occurred from the Myrtle Beach, South Carolina metropolitan area northeastward through the Inner Banks region of North Carolina to the Hampton Roads (Virginia Beach–Norfolk–Newport News, Virginia–North Carolina, metropolitan area) region. Hail up to baseball size was recorded near Galivants Ferry, South Carolina, where a vehicle was damaged. Wind damage also occurred throughout the area as well with many trees and power lines blown down. Near Powellsville, North Carolina, a mobile home was blown over, causing an injury while maintenance buildings at Gatesville Elementary School in Gatesville, North Carolina were damaged as well. Heavy rain from the system also affected the Northeastern United States, forcing the New York Yankees to postpone their home opener against the Boston Red Sox until the next day. PA 611 closed due to flooding afterwards.

== Aftermath ==
Soon after the EF4 tornado in Bryan County, Georgia, a state of emergency was set in place for the Pembroke and Ellabell areas. The American Red Cross set up temporary shelters for displaced citizens, and a curfew was also put in place for the area. Search and rescue teams from numerous neighboring towns came to aid in sweeping the area for injuries and aiding victims. Multiple GoFundMe donation pages also reached support in the thousands as the pages spread through social media.

Following the tornadoes in Allendale County, South Carolina, the governor of South Carolina, Henry McMaster, was asked the declare the area as state of emergency by representative Justin Bamberg. The American Red Cross swiftly set up temporary shelters to aid families. All Allendale county schools were closed following the tornado as well.

== See also ==
- Weather of 2022
- List of North American tornadoes and tornado outbreaks
- List of F4 and EF4 tornadoes
  - List of F4 and EF4 tornadoes (2020–present)
- List of United States tornadoes in April 2022
