= Bryan County School District =

School district in Georgia (U.S. state)

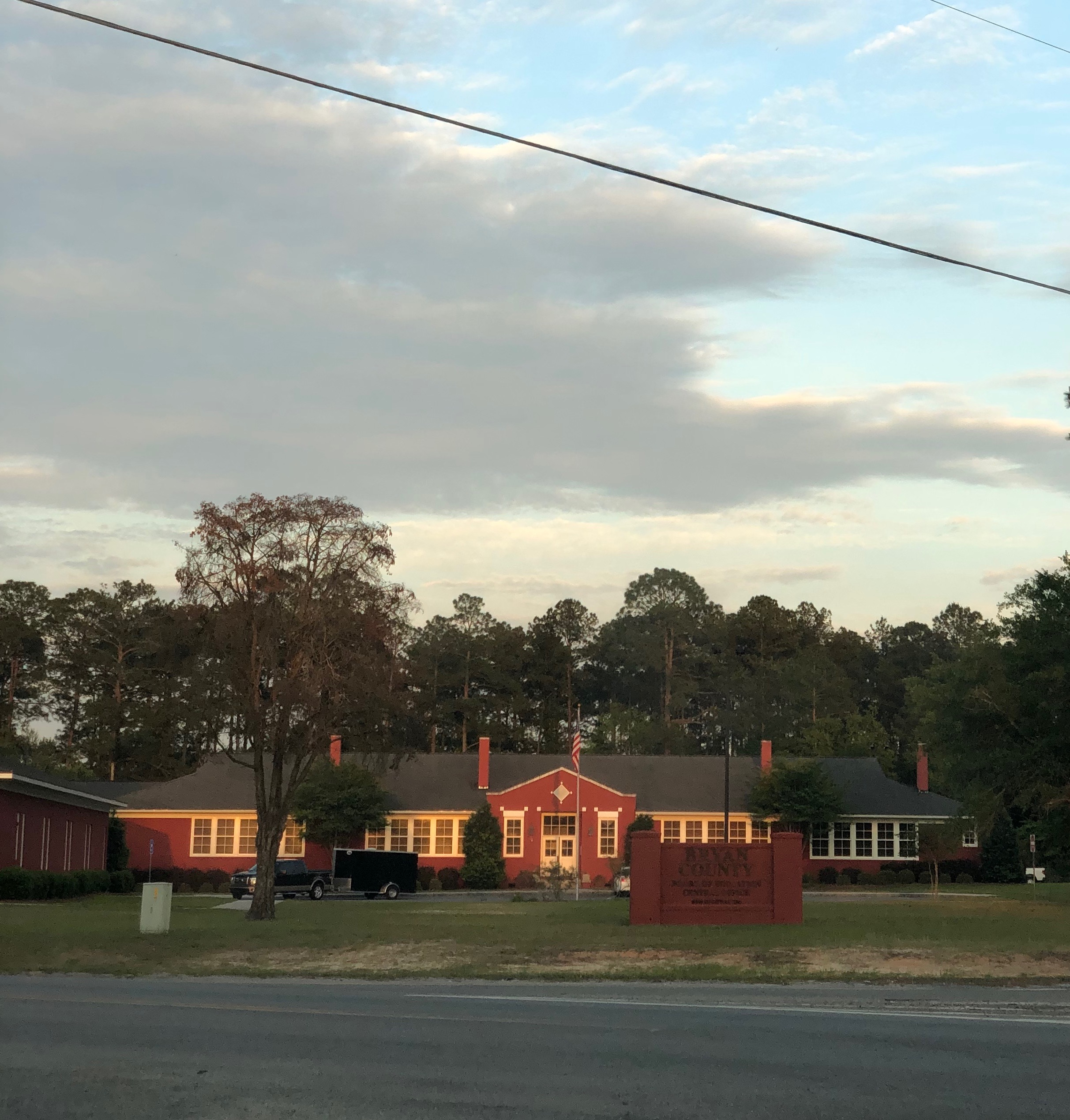

Address
- 8810 US Highway 280 Black Creek, Georgia, 31308; United States
- Coordinates: 32.1791°N 81.537781°W

District information
- Grades: Pre-school - 12
- Superintendent: Paul Brooksher

Students and staff
- Enrollment: 5,552
- Faculty: 328

Other information
- Accreditation: Southern Association of Colleges and Schools; Georgia Accrediting Commission
- Fax: (912) 653-4386
- Website: www.bryan.k12.ga.us

The Bryan County School District is a public school district in Bryan County, Georgia, United States, based in Black Creek. It serves the communities of Belfast, Black Creek, Blitchton, Ellabell, Keller, Pembroke, and Richmond Hill. The Superintendent of the district is Paul Brooksher

It is the designated school district for grades K-12 for the county, except parts in Fort Stewart. Fort Stewart has the Department of Defense Education Activity (DoDEA) as its local school district, for the elementary level. Students at the secondary level on Fort Stewart attend public schools operated by county school districts.

== Schools ==
The Bryan County School District has five elementary schools, One middle school, and two high schools of which one is grade 6-12.

=== Elementary schools ===
- Bryan County Elementary School
- George Washington Carver Elementary School
- Richmond Hill Elementary School
- Richmond Hill Primary School

=== Middle schools ===
- Richmond Hill Middle School

=== High schools ===
- Bryan County High School (Grade 6-12)
- Richmond Hill High School

=== Former schools ===
- Lanier Primary School
- Black Creek Elementary School (merged with Bryan County Elementary School in August 1981)
