= HMGMA =

HMGMA may refer to:

- HackMaster Game Master's Association, a group of HackMaster gamemasters
- Hyundai Motor Group Metaplant America, an electric vehicle factory in Ellabell, Georgia, United States
