= Bryan County Courthouse (Georgia) =

- U.S. National Register of Historic Places
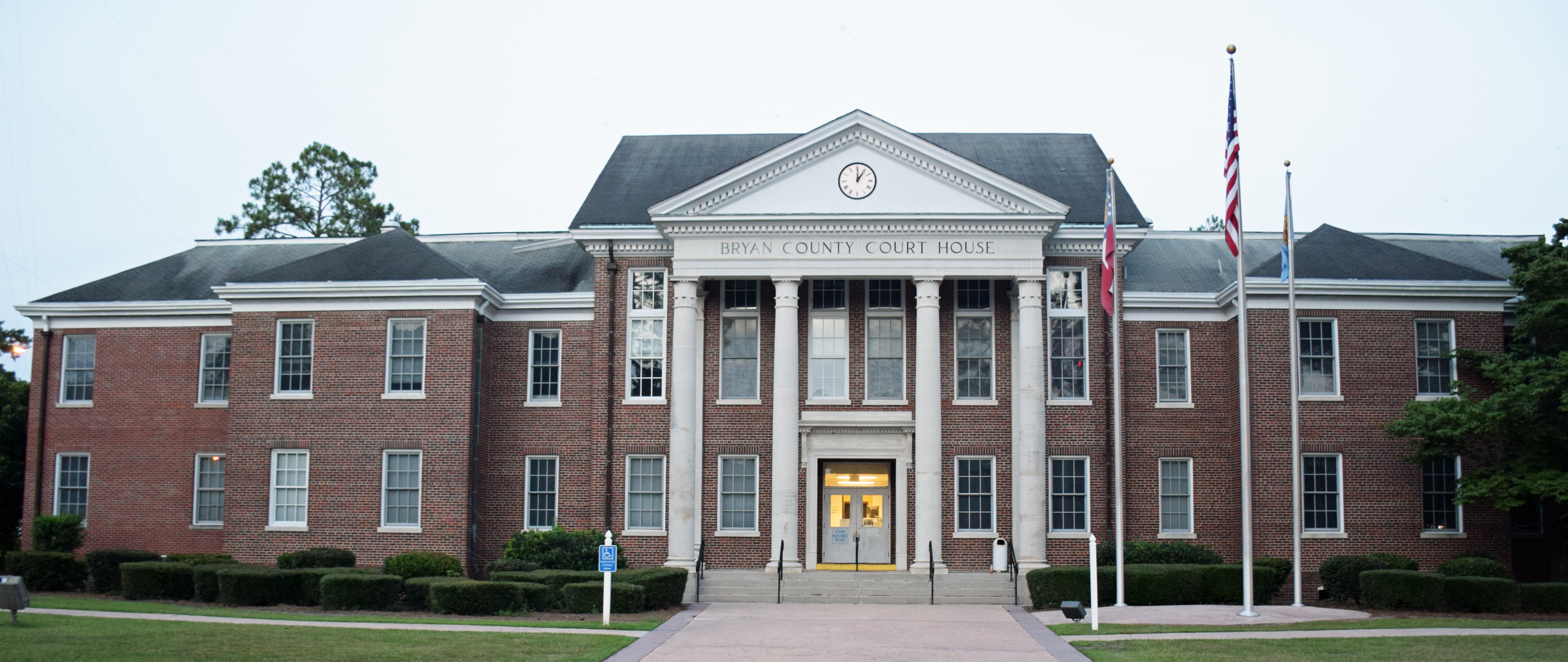
- The courthouse in 2015

- Location within Georgia Location within the United States
- Location: 151 S. College St. Pembroke, Georgia
- Coordinates: 32.13347°N 81.62148°W
- Area: 1.7 acres (0.69 ha)
- Built: 1938
- Architect: Walter P. Marshall (1938 building); Edwin C. Eckles (1990 renovation)
- Architectural style: Classical Revival
- MPS: Georgia County Courthouses TR
- NRHP reference No.: 95000713
- Added to NRHP: June 14, 1995

The Bryan County Courthouse is located in Pembroke, Georgia and was built in 1938 in the Neoclassical Revival style, after Pembroke became the county seat of Bryan County in 1937. It is the third courthouse built for the county. The interior of the building has a cross plan, with entrances on all four sides. Annexes were built in 1969, 1990, and 1993. At the time of construction, it was the most modern and elaborate building in the city.

The courthouse is one of 19 courthouses built in Georgia between 1930 and 1945. It is one of seven Georgia courthouses from that period that are not documented as having been funded by depression-era federal government programs. However, the establishment of Fort Stewart caused the county seat to be moved, so the Department of Defense probably covered the cost.

It was added to the National Register of Historic Places in 1995. It is also part of the Pembroke Historic District, on the NRHP.

The courthouse was damaged on April 5, 2022, when a tornado touched down near the courthouse and passed through the city of Pembroke at EF2 intensity. The tornado went on to strike Black Creek at mid-range EF4 intensity, killing one person and injuring 12 others.

== In popular culture ==
The Courthouse was the filming location of multiple scenes in Episode 8 of the 2019 Hulu series The Act.
