= Hardwick, Georgia =

There are two places named Hardwick in the U.S. state of Georgia:

- Hardwick, Baldwin County, Georgia
- Hardwick, Bryan County, Georgia
