= Myrtle Grove Plantation, Georgia =

Former plantation in Savannah, Georgia

Myrtle Grove Plantation
- Interactive map of the Myrtle Grove Plantation area
- Former names: Folly Farm

General information
- Architectural style: Antebellum architecture
- Location: Richmond Hill, Georgia, U.S., Old Hardwick Road
- Coordinates: 31.8843427°N 81.2454178°W
- Completed: 1849 (177 years ago) (plantation house only)
- Owner: Buck Meeks; John Meeks

Technical details
- Floor count: 2

Myrtle Grove is a historic plantation in Richmond Hill, Bryan County, Georgia, United States.

American Revolutionary War hero Nathanael Greene was gifted a "Myrtle Grove plantation near Savannah from the citizens of Georgia" for his services as major general of the Continental Army.

The plantation house was built in 1849, in the antebellum style, by Union Army brigadier general Richard Arnold as wedding gift for his daughter.

During the 1920s and 1930, the house was owned by Pennsylvania native and district attorney Samuel Pennington Rotan. After his death in January 1930, his widow, Allethaire Chase Rotan, continued to live there. The house was renamed Folly Farm by the Rotans, after their former residence in Abington, Pennsylvania, but was later returned to its original Myrtle Grove name after the property on which the house stands.

It has been owned since 1964 by brothers Walter (Buck) and John Meeks, and has been used as a filming location for over ten movie and television productions, including Glory (1989), The Underground Railroad (2021), Emperor (2020) and The Crickets Dance (2020). It was its appearance in Birth of a Nation (2016) that increased its popularity, however.
