= Daniel Defense =

American guns manufacturer

Daniel Defense LLC
- Type: Private
- Industry: Firearms
- Founded: 2002; 24 years ago in Savannah, Georgia, United States
- Headquarters: 101 Warfighter Way, Black Creek, Georgia, United States
- Key people: Marty Daniel (CEO)
- Products: Firearms
- Website: danieldefense.com

Daniel Defense LLC is an American arms manufacturer founded in 2002 by Marty Daniel in Savannah, Georgia. Following substantial growth from a 2002 U.S. Army Special Forces grant for M4 upper receivers, Daniel Defense expanded in 2009 and moved into a new manufacturing facility in Black Creek, Georgia, where it is now based.

The company's flagship gun is the DDM4 AR platform rifle, which it sells as fully-automatic with SOPMOD parts to military/government agencies and semi-automatic to civilians.

== History and products ==
Daniel Defense began as a hobby of its founder, Marty Daniel. Its year of establishment is variously reported as 2000, 2001, or 2002. Daniel's wife, Cindy Daniel, is chief operating officer of the company. Both Daniels are outspoken supporters of Donald Trump and other Republican Party candidates. The company adopted a direct-to-consumer e-commerce sales model and offered "buy-now-pay-later" plans, allow consumers to acquire costly weapons immediately and pay in installments over time.

Daniel Defense is among the largest privately held manufacturers of firearms and firearm accessories in the US. In 2014 it was named to the Inc. 5000, a list of fast-growing privately held U.S. companies, three times. However, the company is small relative to other gun manufacturers like Colt and Smith & Wesson.

In its early years, Daniel Defense manufactured rails, the components of firearms to which scopes, laser sights, and other accessories are attached. In 2003, the company dramatically expanded, after winning a $20 million USSOCOM contract for specialized rails for M4A1 carbines, beating out entries from Knight's Armament Company and A.R.M.S.

In 2009, the company began manufacturing its own rifles and cold hammer forged barrels. The company produced 24 guns in 2009, and 10,000 guns in 2010. The company manufactured slightly fewer than 53,000 guns in 2020, with less than 1% of U.S. firearms market share.

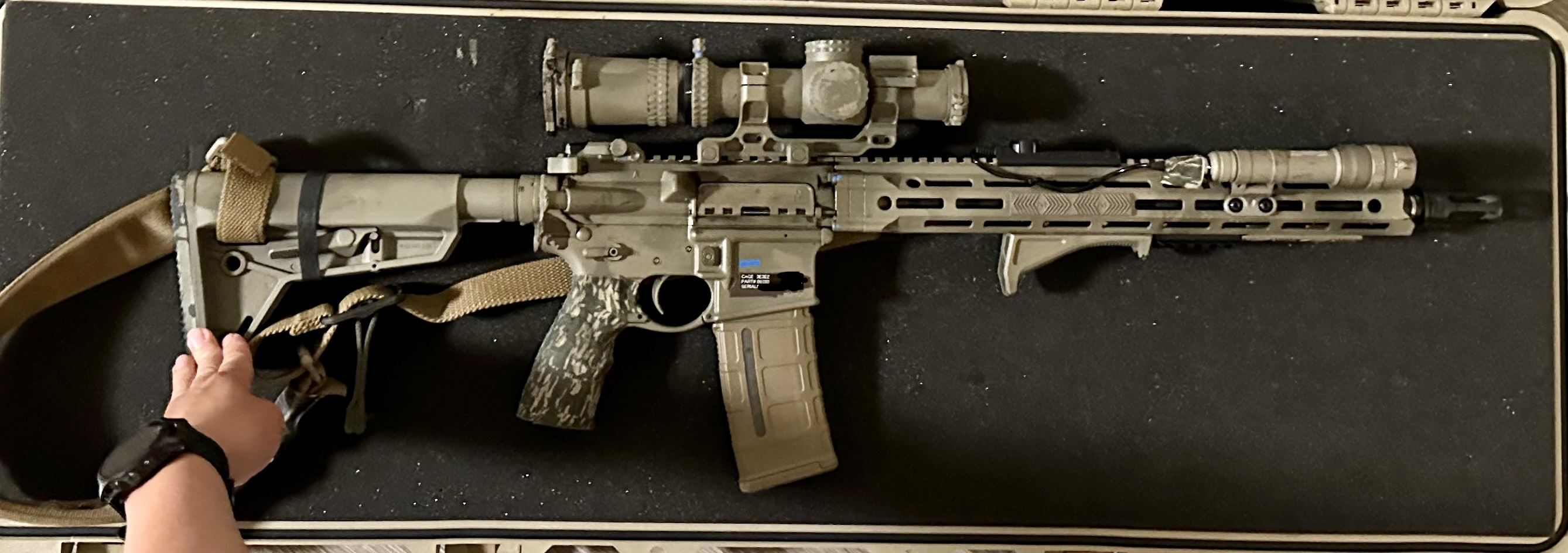
A customized DDM4V7

The company's flagship product is the Daniel Defense DDM4 AR platform rifle. The company sells the DDM4 to the U.S. Department of Defense, foreign militaries, and civilians. The rifle is sold in fully-automatic form to military, police, and other government agencies, with them selling the semi-automatic form of the rifle to civilians. In 2014, Daniel Defense sold DDM4 rifles to the Missouri State Police and North Dakota Highway Patrol, making its first sale of that gun to law enforcement agencies. Daniel Defense also manufactures the 14.5 in (368 mm) barrel and gas block for USSOCOM's Upper Receiver Group-Improved (URG-I).

In 2016, Daniel Defense had sales of $73 million and 279 employees. Marty Daniel stated in 2016 that 90% of the company's sales were to consumers, and 10% were to governments.

The company initially was located in Garden City, Georgia, sharing space with Daniel's other business making overhead doors and fireplaces. In 2008, the company outgrew the space and moved to Black Creek, Georgia, where it is now based. In 2012, the company opened a 90,000-square-foot facility in Ridgeland, South Carolina, but closed that facility in 2016. In late 2017, construction of a new $29 million, 300,000 square foot building for the company was completed in Black Creek, consolidating the company's previous locations in Black Creek and Ridgeland. The formal ribbon-cutting for the new Black Creek facility which employs 210 people, held in May 2018, was attended by Georgia's governor, Nathan Deal, and other state and local officials.

The National Rifle Association of America selected the Daniel Defense V7 as the 2017 gun of the year.

During the COVID-19 pandemic, the company accepted a $3.1 million loan from the federal Paycheck Protection Program.

It bought the Hudson H9 patents, and launched an updated design as the Daniel H9 on January 22, 2024.

== Advertising controversies ==
Daniel Defense is known for its provocative online advertisements. Some of the company's advertisements use pop-culture references or characters that appeal to youth, including references to the Call of Duty series of video games, to Star Wars characters, and to Santa Claus.

Daniel, the company's founder and CEO, has positioned himself as a provocateur, mocking gun control and engaging in publicity stunts to promote the company's products. Ryan Busse, a former executive at gun company Kimber who later became a critic of the gun industry, called Daniel Defense "basically the poster child" of "egregious, aggressive marketing" by gun sellers. Everytown for Gun Safety has also criticized Daniel Defense's advertisements for glorifying "violence and war" in marketing.

=== Super Bowl ad controversy ===
In December 2013, Daniel Defense was involved in controversy when it submitted a television commercial to a group of Fox affiliates for broadcast during local commercial time in the network's broadcast of Super Bowl XLVIII. The stations rejected it, citing the National Football League's commercial policy which states: "Firearms, ammunition or other weapons are prohibited; however, stores that sell firearms and ammunition will be permitted, provided they sell other products and the ads do not mention firearms, ammunition or other weapons."

Daniel Defense responded to the rejection by criticizing the NFL's policy and the decision of those Fox affiliates, asserting that its ad did not contain any firearms and focused instead on the company's surrounding outdoor merchandise, falling within the exceptions in the policy. The NFL responded to the claims by denying any involvement in the rejection of the advertisement, but it did confirm that its policy does ban commercials with firearms in them, and in the end, it was not accepted or aired.

== Relation to mass shootings ==
=== 2017 Las Vegas shooting ===
The arsenal of the 64-year-old perpetrator of the 2017 Las Vegas shooting included two Daniel Defense AR platform rifles, out of the twenty-four found in his hotel rooms, one DDM4 V11 & one DDM4A1, with two others both being DD5 V1 AR-10 type rifles. He killed 60 people and wounded 411, making it the deadliest mass shooting in US history.

=== Uvalde school shooting ===
On May 24, 2022, a Daniel Defense DDM4 V7, an AR platform rifle, was used by the shooter who fatally shot nineteen students, two teachers, and wounded seventeen others in the Uvalde school shooting. The gun was located near the body of the perpetrator.

Daniel Defense was met with social media backlash in the wake of the shooting, including criticism for a now-deleted Twitter post made on May 16 depicting a child holding a Daniel Defense rifle. The manufacturer withdrew from the annual NRA convention held in Houston a few days after the shooting, stating that they believed it wasn't an appropriate time to be promoting their products due to the "horrifying tragedy in Uvalde" where "one of [their] products was criminally misused".

On June 3, 2022, the attorney representing the father of one of the victims requested information from Daniel Defense about their marketing strategy to teens and children. A separate legal action from a school employee also filed a request with the Texas court requesting the same information. This was because the assailant legally purchased firearms the day after his 18th birthday on May 17, 2022, but some sources mention that the assailant did research beforehand on what rifle to use, as the DDM4 is widely regarded as a higher end rifle mentioned earlier.

== See also ==
- List of modern armament manufacturers
