= Bryan County High School =

Public high school in Pembroke, Georgia, United States

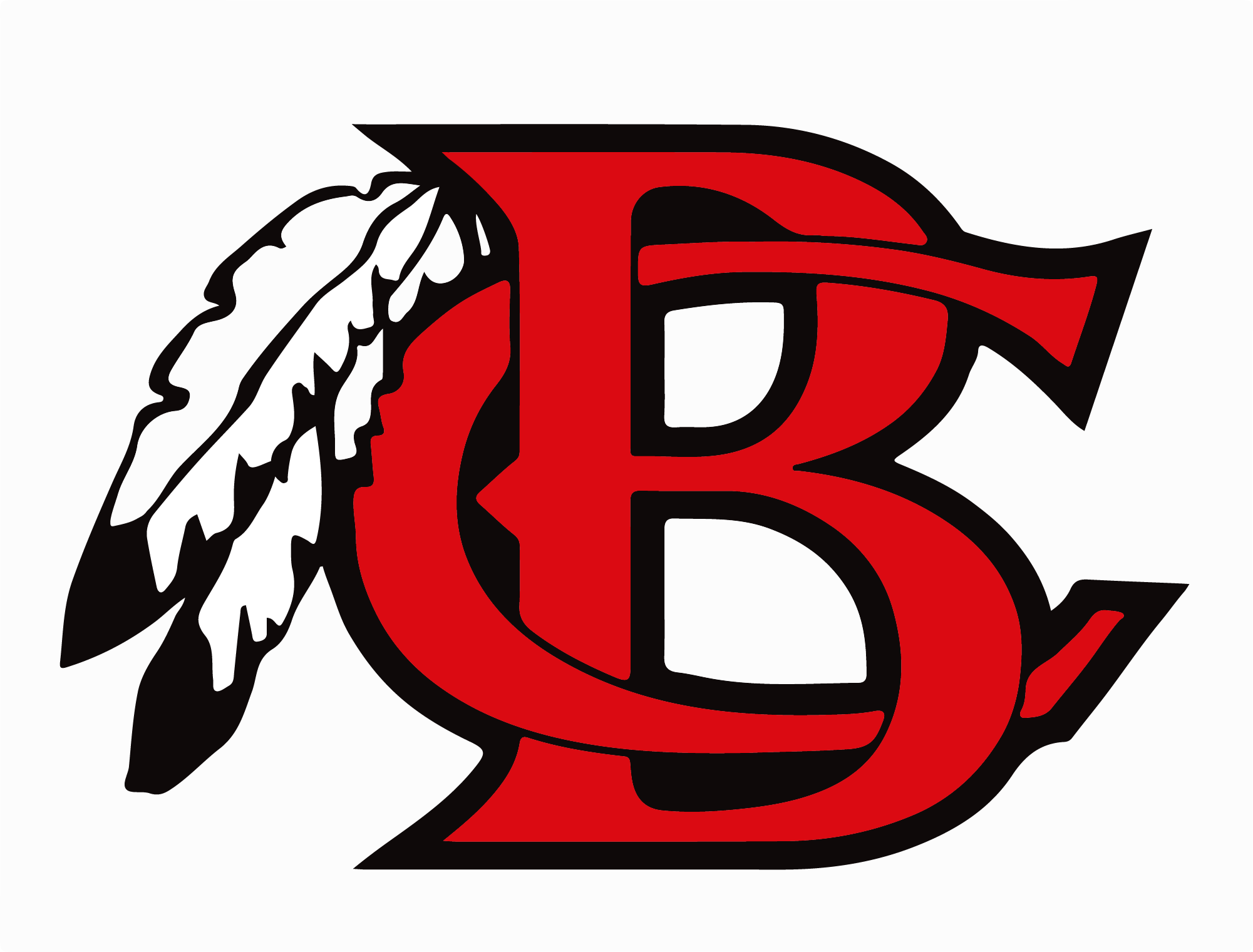
- Logo for Bryan County High School

Location
- 1234 Camellia Drive; Pembroke, Bryan County, Georgia 31321; United States; 32°08′59″N 81°36′35″W

Information
- Type: Public high school
- Motto: "Once a Redskin, Always a Redskin."
- Established: 1985 (41 years ago)
- School district: Bryan County School District
- CEEB code: 112380
- Principal: Russ Winter
- Staff: 46.10 (FTE)
- Grades: 9 – 12
- Enrollment: 561 (2023–2024)
- Student to teacher ratio: 12.17
- Colors: Red, white
- Athletics conference: GHSA Region 3-A
- Nickname: Redskins
- Website: www.bryancountyschools.org/o/bcmhs

Bryan County High School is a public high school in Pembroke, Georgia, United States. The school mascot is the Redskin. The current campus opened in the 1985–86 school year, and is connected to Bryan County Middle School. The current principal is Russ Winter, who has served since the 2023-24 school year.

== Sports ==
Bryan County High School softball team holds the 1983, 1986, and 2001 state championship titles for slow-pitch softball.

Bryan County competes in GHSA Region 3-A

== See also ==
- Native American mascot controversy
- Sports teams named Redskins
