= RHH =

RHH may refer to:

- Real Husbands of Hollywood, a reality TV show
- Restore Hetch Hetchy, an environmental organization focused on the Hetch Hetchy Valley in Yosemite National Park
- The Reverend Horton Heat, an American psychobilly band and the nickname of its leader, Jim Heath
- Royal Hobart Hospital, a hospital in Tasmania

== See also ==
- RHHS (disambiguation)
