= Richmond Hill, Georgia =

- City
- Flag Seal Logo

- Location in Bryan County and the state of Georgia
- Coordinates: 31°56′17″N 81°18′49″W
- Country: United States
- State: Georgia
- County: Bryan
- Settled: 1734
- Incorporated: 1962

Government
  - Type: City Council
  - Mayor: Kristi Cox
  - Councilwoman: Cindy Hatala
  - Councilman: Kevin P. Bowes
  - Councilman: Van Hunter
  - Councilman: Steve Scholar

Area
  - Total: 24.60 sq mi (63.72 km^{2})
  - Land: 23.78 sq mi (61.59 km^{2})
  - Water: 0.82 sq mi (2.13 km^{2})
- Elevation: 20 ft (6 m)

Population (2020)
  - Total: 16,633
  - Density: 699.5/sq mi (270.06/km^{2})
- Time zone: UTC-5 (Eastern (EST))
  - Summer (DST): UTC-4 (EDT)
- ZIP code: 31324
- Area code: 912
- FIPS code: 13-65044
- GNIS feature ID: 0342353
- Website: richmondhill-ga.gov

Richmond Hill is a city in Bryan County, Georgia, United States. The population was 16,633 at the 2020 U.S. census, an increase of almost 80% from the 2010 population of 9,281. Richmond Hill is part of the Savannah metropolitan statistical area.

== History ==
Richmond Hill has a historical connection to industrialist Henry Ford. Ford used the town, formerly known as Ways Station, as a winter home and philanthropic social experiment, building the complex known as the Ford Farms along the Ogeechee River in the 1930s. After just one visit he chose this area as his winter home. Ford's dwelling was built on the site of Richmond Plantation, which was burned by elements of General William T. Sherman's army at the conclusion of the "March to the Sea". Ford's holdings eventually totaled 85,000 acres (340 km^{2}) of agricultural and timber lands, most of which is now owned by the State of Georgia or ITT Rayonier, a timber company. Ford was also responsible for the construction of a number of public buildings, including a kindergarten, which now houses the museum of the Richmond Hill Historical Society, and a chapel which now houses St. Anne's Catholic Church. Both are located on Georgia S.R. 144, also known as Ford Avenue within the Richmond Hill city limits.

The Ford Plantation has now been redeveloped as a luxury resort, with vacation cottages, a clubhouse, tennis, and golf. When it was suggested that the town be renamed "Ford", he declined, and instead Ways Station was renamed "Richmond Hill" after the site of Ford's home on the banks of the Ogeechee River. Another plantation, Myrtle Grove, has been used in several movie and television productions.

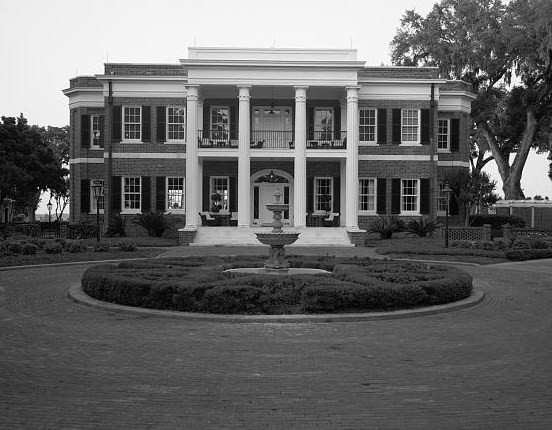
Richmond Hill Plantation, Ford Mansion

Richmond Hill was incorporated as a city in 1962. The current mayor is Kristi Cox. The city is governed by a mayor and a four-member city council.

=== Development ===
Real estate development in Richmond Hill has generally followed trends represented in the United States as a whole. Post-Civil War populations remained relatively stable until the arrival of industrialist Henry Ford in the 1930s. In the early 1970s, subdivisions began to spring up, and began a settlement trend that has continued steadily until the present. Subdivisions of varying quality, ranging from starter homes to exclusive, gated golf communities, have emerged. Locals attribute population growth to the nearest military base, Fort Stewart.

== Geography ==
Richmond Hill is located along the eastern border of Bryan County. The Ogeechee River forms the eastern edge of the city (and the county line); an outlying portion of the city of Savannah is on the opposite side of the river.

U.S. Route 17 (Ocean Highway) passes through the city north of the original downtown. Interstate 95 passes through the western edge of the city, with access from Exit 87 (US 17) and Exit 90 (Georgia State Route 144/Ford Avenue). Downtown Savannah is 21 miles (34 km) to the north, and Brunswick is 58 miles (93 km) to the south.

According to the United States Census Bureau, Richmond Hill has a total area of 14.6 square miles (37.9 km^{2}), of which 14.4 square miles (37.4 km^{2}) is land and 0.19 square miles (0.5 km^{2}), or 1.42%, is water.

== Demographics ==
Historical population
Census	Pop.	Note	%±
1970	826		—
1980	1,177		42.5%
1990	2,934		149.3%
2000	6,959		137.2%
2010	9,281		33.4%
2020	16,633		79.2%
2025 (est.)	20,022	▲	20.4%
U.S. Decennial Census; 2025

=== 2020 census ===
As of the 2020 census, Richmond Hill had a population of 16,633. The median age was 32.3 years. 30.4% of residents were under age 18, and 9.1% were age 65 or older. For every 100 females, there were 90.6 males; for every 100 females age 18 and over, there were 84.4 males.

93.6% of residents lived in urban areas, while 6.4% lived in rural areas.

There were 5,846 households in Richmond Hill, of which 48.3% had children under age 18 living in them. Of all households, 54.2% were married-couple households, 12.8% were male householder households with no spouse or partner present, and 27.4% were female householder households with no spouse or partner present. About 19.6% of all households were made up of individuals, and 6.7% had someone living alone who was age 65 or older. There were 3,431 families residing in the city.

There were 6,380 housing units, of which 8.4% were vacant. The homeowner vacancy rate was 3.6%, and the rental vacancy rate was 9.3%.

Richmond Hill racial composition as of 2020
Race	Num.	Perc.
White (non-Hispanic)	10,072	60.55%
Black or African American (non-Hispanic)	2,936	17.65%
Native American	43	0.26%
Asian	665	4.0%
Pacific Islander	14	0.08%
Other/Mixed	1,095	6.58%
Hispanic or Latino	1,808	10.87%

== Economy ==
Small businesses with fewer than 20 employees make up 93% of the employers.

=== Major employers ===
#	Employer
1	Hobart Corporation
2	City of Richmond Hill
3	South State Bank
4	Allied Van Lines
5	Kroger
6	South Coast Medical
7	Publix

== Education ==
Bryan County School District serves Richmond Hill. The town has seven public schools for students between the ages of five and 21 (21 in cases of challenged high-school students). They are Richmond Hill Primary School (RHPS), Richmond Hill Elementary School (RHES), George Washington Carver Upper Elementary School (GWCES), McAllister Elementary School (MES), France Meeks Elementary School (FMES) Richmond Hill Middle School (RHMS), and Richmond Hill High School (RHHS). Of the two high schools, Richmond Hill High has the highest scores in Bryan County. The city is currently expanding its schools due to a large spike in the number of people migrating to the city during the last thirty years. Two new elementary, a middle schools, and an expanded high school have been built recently. Richmond Hill is expected to grow exponentially in the next few years based on the trend of the increasing population since the early-1990s.

== Healthcare ==
In 2011, Winn Army Community Hospital opened to serve the large military population in the area. It serves military retirees and their families only. For the general public, the nearest emergency room is located in Savannah at St. Joseph's Hospital, about 15 miles (24 km) away.

== Community ==
=== Events ===
Richmond Hill hosts a number of community events at J.F. Gregory Park. Throughout the year the community comes together for supporting special events and causes, such as:

- Annual Easter Extravaganza
- Annual Memorial Day Observance
- Annual First Day of Summer Prayer Breakfast
- National Night Out
- Old Time Family Fourth of July Festival & Fireworks
- Annual Pumpkin Patch
- Annual Veterans Day Observance
- Annual Chili Cook-off

=== Religion ===
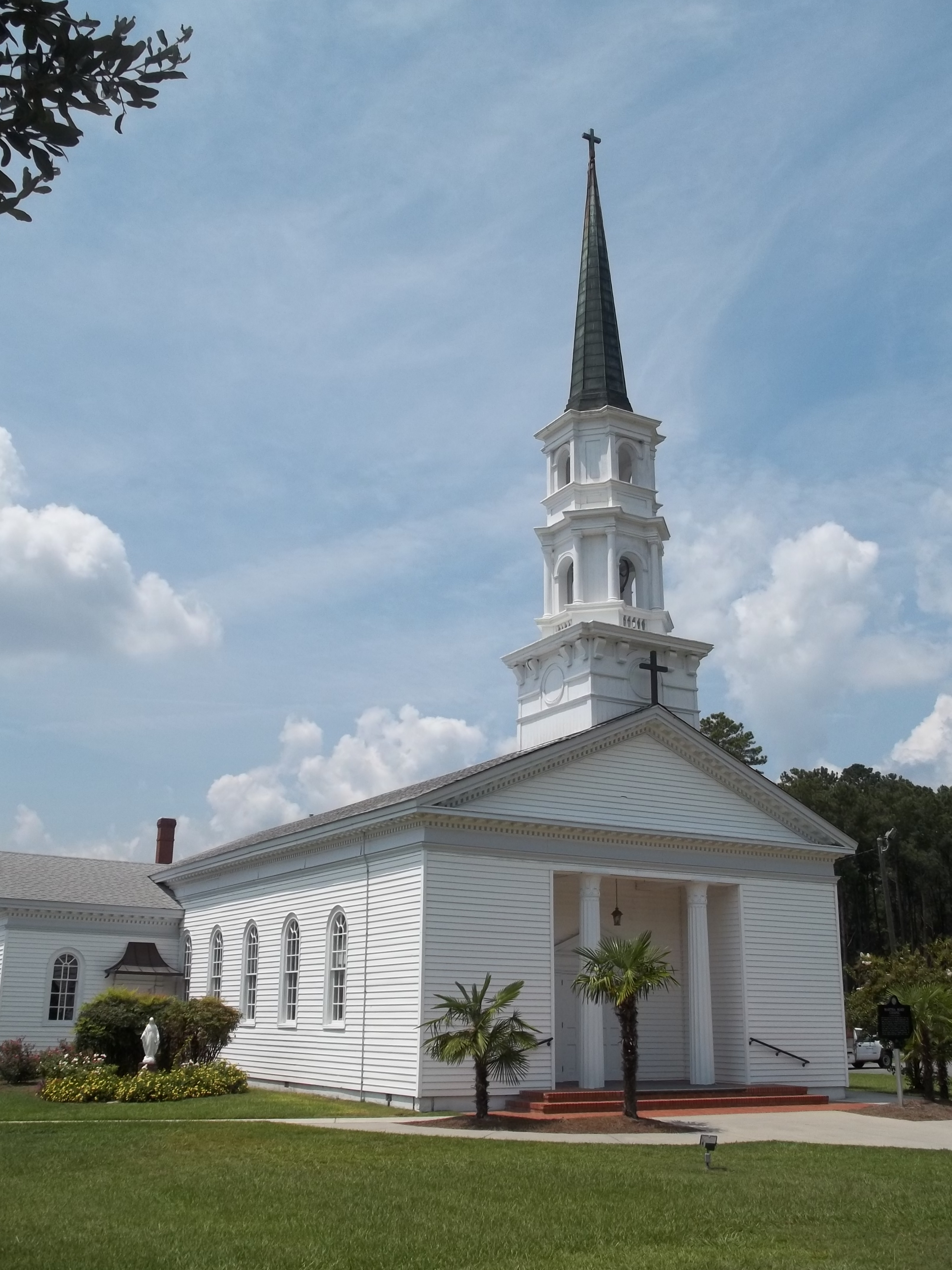
The Martha Mary Chapel

While a small majority of citizens in Richmond Hill are non-religious, Christianity is the second largest. Christianity denominations include Protestant and Catholic. Richmond Hill is home to over 20 churches of various denominations.

Many church organizations participate cooperatively in outreach programs that benefit the community as a whole. The "Food for the Soul" soup kitchen, staffed by individuals from ten separate churches that rotate on a weekly basis, delivers hot meals to families in need within Richmond Hill. The Way Station, another multiple church outreach program, has been in operation for over twenty years providing food, clothing, and other items that enhance the lives of families in the community.

=== Community service groups ===
- Richmond Hill Rotary Club
- Richmond Hill Exchange Club
- Richmond Hill Lions Club
- Richmond Hill Veterans of Foreign Wars, Post 7331
- Richmond Hill Garden Club - Senior's Center
- Richmond Hill Sons of Confederate Veterans
- Bryan Lodge #303 F&AM

== Notable people ==
- Nick Fitzgerald, college football quarterback
