= Egan, Texas =

- Unincorporated community
- Location within Texas Location within the United States
- Coordinates: 32°27′10″N 97°18′00″W
- Country: United States
- State: Texas
- County: Johnson
- Elevation: 840 ft (256 m)
- Time zone: UTC-6 (Central (CST))
  - Summer (DST): UTC-5 (CDT)
- ZIP Code: 76031
- Area codes: 817, 682
- GNIS feature ID: 1378243

Egan is an unincorporated community in Johnson County, Texas, United States. It is located at the intersection of Farm to Market roads 917 and 2280, approximately 8 miles (13 km) northeast of Cleburne.

Egan is part of the Joshua Independent School District.

== History ==
The area was first settled during the Civil War by M.J., J.P., and W.E. Miller. The site was surveyed in 1883 by the Missouri, Kansas and Texas Railroad after it extended its tracks through the area- a surveyor would give Egan its name. The same year, a post office was established and by 1885, the town had 50 residents, a store, school, and two churches. A winery was established in the twentieth century, but closed during Prohibition. The post office closed in 1930 and the population would decline from its peak of 115 in the mid-1920s to approximately 21 by 2000. The town was heavily damaged by an EF2 tornado on April 4, 2022. One person was injured by the tornado.
