= Richmond Hill High School =

Richmond Hill High School may refer to:

- Richmond Hill High School (Georgia), in Richmond Hill
- Richmond Hill High School (Ontario), in Richmond Hill
- Richmond Hill High School (Queens), in New York
