= Clyde, Georgia =

Extinct town in Georgia, U.S.

Coordinates: 32°00′39″N 81°24′31″W

Clyde is a ghost town in Bryan County, in the U.S. state of Georgia.

== History ==
Clyde once held the county seat of Bryan County. The community was named after Field Marshal Colin Campbell, 1st Baron Clyde (1792–1863), a Scottish soldier. A variant name was "Eden". A post office called Clyde was established in 1887, and remained in operation until 1941.
