= Ellabell, Georgia =

Unincorporated community in Georgia, U.S.

Coordinates: 32°07′25″N 81°29′08″W

Locations in Georgia (U.S. state)

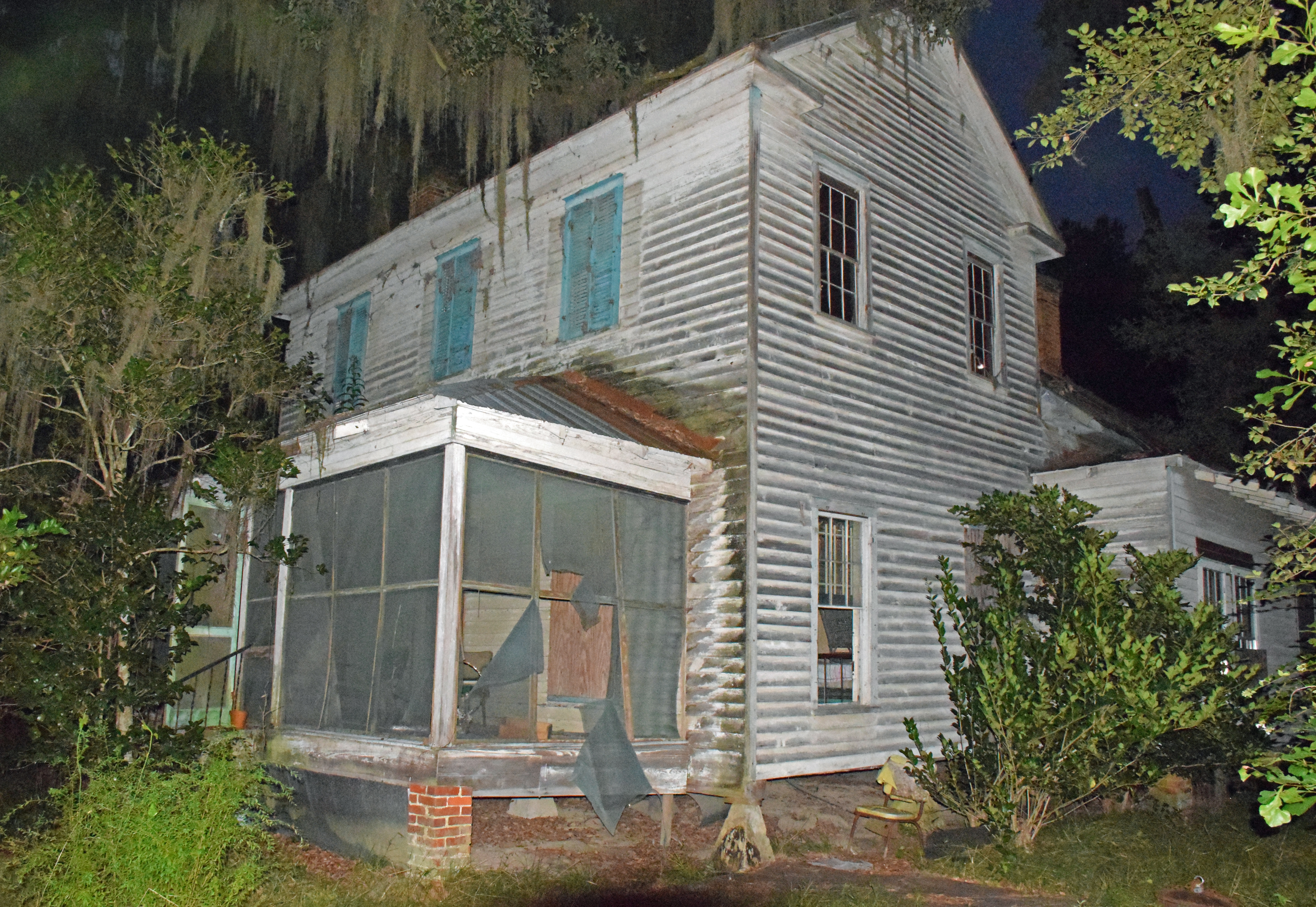
Glen Echo house

Ellabell is an unincorporated community in Bryan County, Georgia, United States. It is on the outskirts of Savannah, It is located on Georgia Route 204 about 7 miles (11 km) east of Pembroke, Georgia, and about 23 miles (37 km) west of Savannah. The community is centered around an intersection of GA SR 204 and Black Creek Church Road, which is a county road. The Georgia Central Railway which runs parallel to GA SR 204 (until a point about 3 miles (4.8 km) east of Ellabell) also passes through Ellabell. Ellabell is the location of Glen Echo, which is listed on the U.S. National Register of Historic Places. Ellabell is located in the Savannah metropolitan area.

Ellabell, Georgia, shares zip code 31308 with the other surrounding unincorporated communities of Blitchton, Georgia, and Black Creek, Georgia. According to the Census Bureau the population for the combined area was 7,353 in 2017.

Hyundai Motor Group Metaplant America is located in Ellabell.

== History ==
On September 4, 2025, 475 foreign workers at the Hyundai-LG plant under construction were arrested for working illegally in the United States. Most of those arrested were men from the Republic of Korea.

== Notable people ==
- Mattie Belle Davis, the first woman judge of Metropolitan Court of Dade County, Florida, and first woman in Florida elected to the American Bar Foundation, the second woman to be elected in the US. A street in Ellabell is named in her honor.
- Justin Smiley, a former NFL player for the San Francisco 49ers, is also from Ellabell.
