= Mattie Belle Davis =

American judge

Mattie Belle Davis

Mattie Belle Davis (1910–2004) was a judge and the first woman from Florida elected to the American Bar Foundation and the second woman to be elected in the US.

She was born in Ellabell, Georgia and her family moved to Miami, Florida in 1926. She was admitted to the Florida bar in 1939. This was the era when women could not sit on juries in Florida. They were unable to do so until 1947. She was the first woman judge of Metropolitan Court of Dade County, Florida. She was judge of that court from 1959 to 1965. She and her husband Troy Davis went into practice and continued until his death in 1948.

March 3 is "Mattie Belle Davis Day" in Dade County, an honor she was presented with in 1987. She was instrumental in forming the Florida Association of Women Lawyers later renamed the Florida Association for Women Lawyers (FAWL). She was the association's president from 1957 to 1958. The Florida Association for Women Lawyers established the Mattie Belle Davis Society in 2004 in honor of Judge Davis to enable FAWL members to contribute directly to FAWL's key initiatives. She died in 2004 at the age of 93.

A street is named in her honor in Ellabell, Georgia.
