= Hyundai Motor Group Metaplant America =

Automobile factory outside of Savannah, Georgia, United States

- Built: 2022–2024
- Operated: October 2024; 1 year ago
- Location: 1500 Genesis Drive; Ellabell, Georgia, United States
- Coordinates: 32.1625°N 81.4450°W
- Industry: Automotive
- Products: Electric vehicles Hybrid vehicles
- Employees: 3,200+ (as of October 2025)
- Area: 2,284 acres (924 ha)
- Owner: Hyundai Motor Group

Hyundai Motor Group Metaplant America (HMGMA) is an electric vehicle (EV) production site operated by Hyundai and located in Ellabell, Bryan County, Georgia, United States. The $7.6 billion campus was built along Interstate 16 about 25 miles (40 km) west of downtown Savannah, with over 16 million square feet (1.5 million m^{2}) of factory floor space. The company will also produce batteries in a joint venture with LG Energy Solution at a separate site now under construction.

== History ==
The land occupied by HMGMA was previously designated by Bryan County as the Bryan County Mega Site. Volvo had considered the area for a new manufacturing plant in 2015, but ultimately built a factory in South Carolina instead. Six years later, with hopes of successfully attracting a large manufacturer or an automaker, the area was purchased in 2021 for $61 million by the state of Georgia, Bryan and Chatham counties, and the Savannah Harbor-Interstate 16 Corridor Joint Development Authority; (Note: The JDA is composed of development authorities from Bryan, Bulloch, Chatham and Effingham counties.) the deal combined three separately-owned parcels of land. The site lies directly off of Interstate 16, with existing Class I rail links and close access to Interstate 95 and the Port of Savannah.

Discussions between Hyundai and government officials began in January 2022. Hyundai announced the factory in April 2022, and construction on the 2,284-acre (924 ha) site began that October. A groundbreaking ceremony held on October 25 was attended by Hyundai CEO and chairman Chung Eui-sun, Georgia governor Brian Kemp, U.S. senators Jon Ossoff and Raphael Warnock, U.S. representative Buddy Carter, and deputy Secretary of Commerce Don Graves. Despite reports, Hyundai announced it would establish both the automotive and battery manufacturing facilities prior to the introduction of the Inflation Reduction Act and stated that the law had not influenced the company's decisions.

Full production at HMGMA began in October 2024; the first model produced was the 2025 Ioniq 5. Hyundai plans to offer tours of the factory to the public.

=== 2025 immigration raid ===
Immigration authorities raided the site on September 4, 2025, detaining about 450 workers, most of them South Korean nationals. The United States Department of Homeland Security described it as the largest immigration enforcement operation carried out at a single location. The workers had been involved with the construction of a battery plant to be operated in partnership with LG Energy Solution. The raid prompted diplomatic concern from the South Korean government and delayed production by two to three months. LG stated that its employees and those from its partnering companies had been taken into custody. Hyundai said that none of those detained were its employees.

== Economic impact ==
HMGMA and its supporting factories have been called the largest economic development project in Georgia history.

The automobile assembly plant is an investment of $7.6 billion by Hyundai and employed over 1,400 people as of October 2024, with plans to hire 8,100 by 2031. In October 2025, around 3,200 people worked at the factory.

The site also includes a $4.3 billion battery manufacturing facility called the HL-GA Battery Company, operated as joint venture between Hyundai and LG Energy Solution.

In the surrounding area, 17 suppliers have announced new factories to support HMGMA, which combined will invest an additional estimated total of $2.7 billion and employ another 7,000 workers; manufacturers include DAS Corporation (metal seat frames), Doowon Climate Control America, Hanon Systems, PHA, Seoyon E-HWA, and Woory Industrial.

The Georgia Department of Transportation has planned several upgrades to surrounding infrastructure, including widening US 280, constructing frontage roads along I-16, and expanding the interchange at Old Cuyler Road.

== Operations ==
Hyundai calls the plant a "Metaplant" and its employees "Meta Pros". According to the company, "the prefix 'meta' can mean transformative or transcending. Using those definitions, the Metaplant will transform the definition of what an automotive plant is".

According to Hyundai, the factory uses autonomous vehicles instead of conveyor belts to move vehicle bodies.

Hyundai expects around 70% of completed vehicles to be shipped by rail via the Georgia Central Railway, and constructed an additional rail siding to handle the volume of autorack cars.

Logistical solutions for the factory are handled by Hyundai GLOVIS EV Logistics America, a subsidiary of Hyundai Glovis, which coordinates the transportation of parts and finished vehicles.

The water tower located at the factory site along I-16 features artwork by students from Savannah College of Art and Design.

Hyundai plans to reach full production of over 500,000 vehicles per year at HMGMA.

== Products ==
=== Vehicles ===
- Hyundai Ioniq 5 (2024–present)
- Hyundai Ioniq 9 (2024–present)
- Kia Sportage Hybrid (2026–present)

== Incidents and concerns ==
=== Safety ===
A 2024 investigation by Savannah television station WTOC 11 found that during construction of the plant, from April 2023 to July 2024, 53 injuries were reported with 14 of them described as "traumatic"; at least one worker died. The Occupational Safety and Health Administration (OSHA) opened more than a dozen investigations, and multiple subcontractors were sued or fined for safety violations.

In March 2025, a man was killed by a forklift driver, and that May, another worker was crushed to death.

=== Water ===
In October 2024, the Georgia Environmental Protection Division approved withdrawals of 6.625 million U.S. gallons (25.08 million liters) of water per day from the Floridan aquifer and allowing for the drilling of four new wells in Bulloch County. This is a temporary solution as Bryan County is legally required to implement an alternative water source for HMGMA within 25 years.

== See also ==
- List of Hyundai Motor Company manufacturing facilities
