= Bryan County, Georgia =

County in Georgia, United States

- County
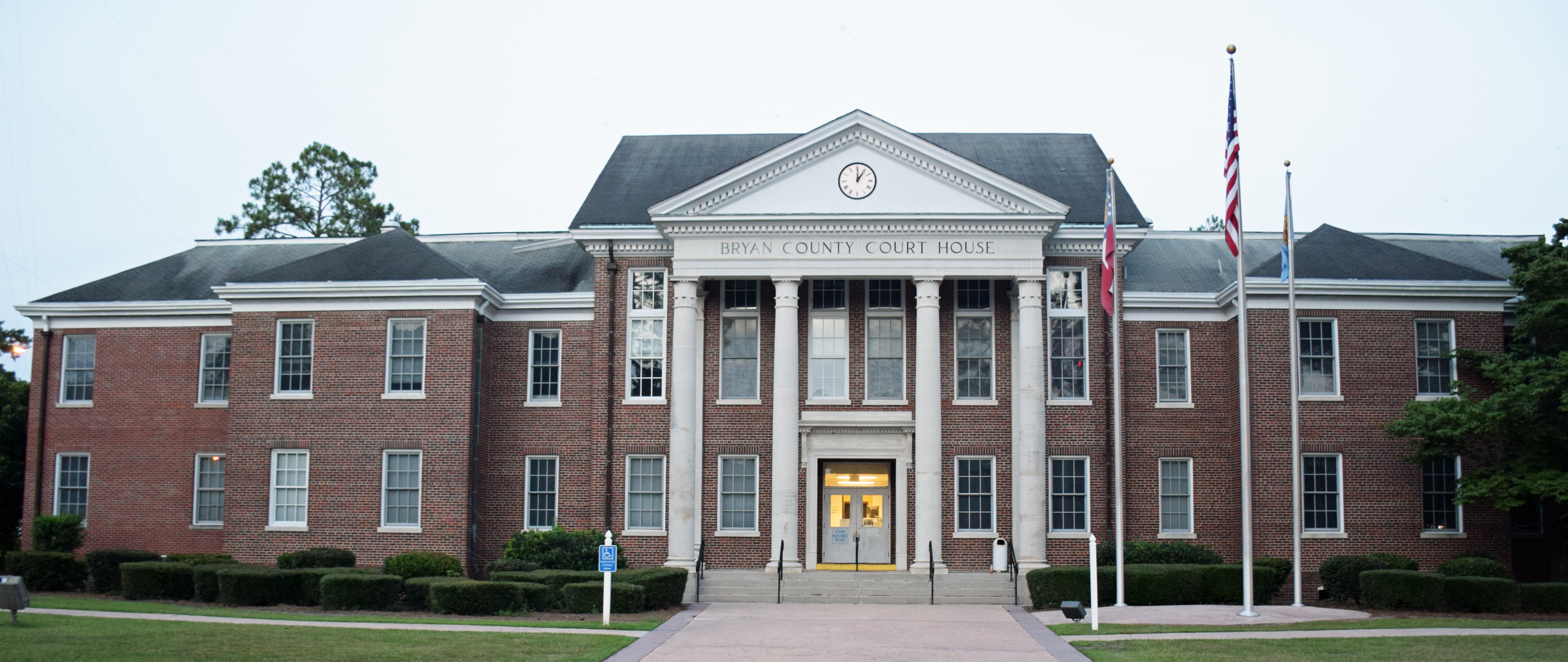
- Bryan County Courthouse in Pembroke

- Seal

- Location within the U.S. state of Georgia
- Coordinates: 32.02°N 81.44°W
- Country: United States
- State: Georgia
- Founded: 1793; 233 years ago
- Named for: Jonathan Bryan
- Seat: Pembroke
- Largest city: Richmond Hill

Area
  - Total: 454 sq mi (1,180 km^{2})
  - Land: 436 sq mi (1,130 km^{2})
  - Water: 18 sq mi (47 km^{2}) 4.1%

Population (2020)
  - Total: 44,738
  - Estimate (2025): 52,062 ▲
  - Density: 103/sq mi (40/km^{2})
- Time zone: UTC−5 (Eastern)
  - Summer (DST): UTC−4 (EDT)
- Congressional district: 1st
- Website: www.bryancountyga.gov

Bryan County is a county located in the U.S. state of Georgia. As of the 2020 census, the population was 44,738. The county seat is Pembroke.

Bryan County is part of the Savannah, Georgia metropolitan statistical area.

The Bryan County Courthouse is listed on the National Register of Historic Places.

== History ==
Bryan County was created on December 19, 1793, named after Jonathan Bryan (1708–1788), an American Revolutionary War partisan.

South Bryan County is home to the earthen Civil War installation Fort McAllister (now Fort McAllister Historic Park) which Gen. William Sherman captured on his March to the Sea.

The colonial town of Hardwick, laid out in 1755, served as the initial county seat. In 1797, the Georgia General Assembly moved the county seat to Cross Roads near modern Richmond Hil. On November 18, 1814, the county seat was moved to Mansford on the Canoochee River. In 1860, the seat was known as Eden. By the 1880s the county seat was known as Bryan. By 1895 it was in Clyde, which may have been the same location formerly known as Eden and Mansford. Clyde served as the seat to 1935; in 1937 Pembroke took on that role. The only remaining sign of Clyde is a cemetery on the Fort Stewart U.S. Army installation.

== Geography ==
According to the U.S. Census Bureau, the county has a total area of 454 square miles (1,180 km^{2}), of which 436 square miles (1,130 km^{2}) is land and 18 square miles (47 km^{2}) (4.1%) is water.

A triangular area in the northeast of Bryan County, from northwest of Pembroke to north of Richmond Hill, is located in the Lower Ogeechee River sub-basin of the Ogeechee River basin, as is the northern half of the remaining area in the county south of Richmond Hill. The northwestern portion of the county, from east of Daisy to Richmond Hill, is located in the Canoochee River sub-basin of the Ogeechee River basin. The rest of Bryan County is located in the Ogeechee Coastal sub-basin of the same Ogeechee River basin. The Ogeechee River forms the northeastern border of the country, while the Jerico River forms the southeast border.

Bryan County is unique in that it is totally divided by the military installation at Fort Stewart. Pembroke is in more rural north Bryan, while Richmond Hill in south Bryan County is a suburb of Savannah. To travel between the two on public roads, it is necessary to leave the county.

=== Major highways ===
- I-16 / SR 404 (unsigned)
- I-95 / SR 405 (unsigned)
- US 17 / SR 25
- US 80 / SR 26
- US 280
- SR 30
- SR 67
- SR 119
- SR 144
  - SR 144 Spur
- SR 196
- SR 204

=== Adjacent counties ===
- Effingham County, Georgia - north
- Chatham County, Georgia - northeast
- Liberty County, Georgia - south/southwest
- Evans County, Georgia - west
- Bulloch County, Georgia - northwest

== Communities ==
=== Cities ===
- Pembroke (County Seat)
- Richmond Hill (Biggest City)

=== Census-designated place ===
- Buckhead

=== Unincorporated communities ===
- Black Creek
- Blitchton
- Ellabell
- Keller
- Lanier

== Demographics ==
Historical population
Census	Pop.	Note	%±
1800	2,836		—
1810	2,827		−0.3%
1820	3,021		6.9%
1830	3,139		3.9%
1840	3,182		1.4%
1850	3,424		7.6%
1860	4,015		17.3%
1870	5,252		30.8%
1880	4,929		−6.2%
1890	5,520		12.0%
1900	6,122		10.9%
1910	6,702		9.5%
1920	6,343		−5.4%
1930	5,952		−6.2%
1940	6,288		5.6%
1950	5,965		−5.1%
1960	6,226		4.4%
1970	6,539		5.0%
1980	10,175		55.6%
1990	15,438		51.7%
2000	23,417		51.7%
2010	30,233		29.1%
2020	44,738		48.0%
2025 (est.)	52,062	▲	16.4%
U.S. Decennial Census; 1790-1880 1890-1910; 1920-1930 1930-1940; 1940-1950 1960-1980; 1980-2000 2010

=== Racial and ethnic composition ===
Bryan County, Georgia – Racial and ethnic composition Note: the US Census treats Hispanic/Latino as an ethnic category. This table excludes Latinos from the racial categories and assigns them to a separate category. Hispanics/Latinos may be of any race.
Race / Ethnicity (NH = Non-Hispanic)	Pop 1980	Pop 1990	Pop 2000	Pop 2010	Pop 2020	% 1980	% 1990	% 2000	% 2010	% 2020
White alone (NH)	7,902	12,932	19,138	23,446	31,321	77.66%	83.77%	81.73%	77.55%	70.01%
Black or African American alone (NH)	2,159	2,289	3,272	4,210	6,330	21.22%	14.83%	13.97%	13.93%	14.15%
Native American or Alaska Native alone (NH)	19	22	69	81	102	0.19%	0.14%	0.29%	0.27%	0.23%
Asian alone (NH)	10	58	174	473	1,032	0.10%	0.38%	0.74%	1.56%	2.31%
Native Hawaiian or Pacific Islander alone (NH)	x	x	16	22	53	x	x	0.07%	0.07%	0.12%
Other race alone (NH)	0	1	22	62	184	0.00%	0.01%	0.09%	0.21%	0.41%
Mixed race or Multiracial (NH)	x	x	261	603	2,447	x	x	1.11%	1.99%	5.47%
Hispanic or Latino (any race)	85	136	465	1,336	3,269	0.84%	0.88%	1.99%	4.42%	7.31%
Total	10,175	15,438	23,417	30,233	44,738	100.00%	100.00%	100.00%	100.00%	100.00%

=== 2020 census ===
As of the 2020 United States census, the county had a population of 44,738, 15,445 households, and 10,140 families residing in the county. Of the residents, 28.9% were under the age of 18 and 11.4% were 65 years of age or older; the median age was 35.5 years. For every 100 females there were 95.3 males, and for every 100 females age 18 and over there were 91.3 males. 53.2% of residents lived in urban areas and 46.8% lived in rural areas.

The racial makeup of the county was 72.0% White, 14.5% Black or African American, 0.3% American Indian and Alaska Native, 2.4% Asian, 0.1% Native Hawaiian and Pacific Islander, 2.2% from some other race, and 8.5% from two or more races. Hispanic or Latino residents of any race comprised 7.3% of the population.

Of the 15,445 households in the county, 44.8% had children under the age of 18 living with them and 21.7% had a female householder with no spouse or partner present. About 17.2% of all households were made up of individuals and 7.0% had someone living alone who was 65 years of age or older.

There were 16,703 housing units, of which 7.5% were vacant. Among occupied housing units, 72.9% were owner-occupied and 27.1% were renter-occupied. The homeowner vacancy rate was 2.6% and the rental vacancy rate was 8.2%.

== Economy ==
Bryan County is the location of Hyundai Motor Group Metaplant America (HMGMA), a large production site for electric vehicles (EV), which became operational in 2024. It is by far the largest employer of the county.

== Education ==
Bryan County School District is the designated school district for grades K-12 for the county, except parts in Fort Stewart. Fort Stewart has the Department of Defense Education Activity (DoDEA) as its local school district, for the elementary level. Students at the secondary level on Fort Stewart attend public schools operated by county school districts.

== Politics ==
As of the 2020s, Bryan County is a Republican stronghold, voting 68% for Donald Trump in 2024. For elections to the United States House of Representatives, Bryan County is part of Georgia's 1st congressional district, currently represented by Buddy Carter. For elections to the Georgia State Senate, Bryan County is part of district 1. For elections to the Georgia House of Representatives, Bryan County is divided between districts 160 and 164.

United States presidential election results for Bryan County, Georgia
Year	Republican		Democratic		Third party(ies)	
Year	No.	%	No.	%	No.	%
1912	114	17.98%	400	63.09%	120	18.93%
1916	17	5.30%	295	91.90%	9	2.80%
1920	21	10.71%	175	89.29%	0	0.00%
1924	9	4.33%	196	94.23%	3	1.44%
1928	151	40.81%	219	59.19%	0	0.00%
1932	17	4.56%	353	94.64%	3	0.80%
1936	63	9.01%	632	90.41%	4	0.57%
1940	49	5.30%	874	94.49%	2	0.22%
1944	90	11.57%	688	88.43%	0	0.00%
1948	135	7.67%	1,147	65.21%	477	27.12%
1952	331	25.42%	971	74.58%	0	0.00%
1956	331	21.04%	1,242	78.96%	0	0.00%
1960	428	24.44%	1,323	75.56%	0	0.00%
1964	1,433	62.58%	857	37.42%	0	0.00%
1968	381	16.08%	560	23.64%	1,428	60.28%
1972	1,409	84.27%	263	15.73%	0	0.00%
1976	761	27.12%	2,045	72.88%	0	0.00%
1980	1,212	37.47%	1,966	60.77%	57	1.76%
1984	2,265	61.83%	1,398	38.17%	0	0.00%
1988	2,802	66.16%	1,423	33.60%	10	0.24%
1992	2,789	47.05%	2,031	34.26%	1,108	18.69%
1996	3,577	57.06%	2,152	34.33%	540	8.61%
2000	4,835	68.49%	2,172	30.77%	52	0.74%
2004	7,363	73.67%	2,590	25.92%	41	0.41%
2008	9,112	70.82%	3,636	28.26%	119	0.92%
2012	9,560	70.94%	3,707	27.51%	209	1.55%
2016	10,529	68.95%	4,014	26.29%	728	4.77%
2020	14,240	66.70%	6,738	31.56%	371	1.74%
2024	16,738	67.90%	7,779	31.56%	134	0.54%

United States Senate election results for Bryan County, Georgia2
Year	Republican		Democratic		Third party(ies)	
Year	No.	%	No.	%	No.	%
2020	14,067	66.47%	6,497	30.70%	599	2.83%
2020	12,596	67.66%	6,020	32.34%	0	0.00%

United States Senate election results for Bryan County, Georgia3
Year	Republican		Democratic		Third party(ies)	
Year	No.	%	No.	%	No.	%
2020	7,950	38.06%	3,941	18.87%	8,997	43.07%
2020	12,596	67.70%	6,009	32.30%	0	0.00%
2022	11,143	65.83%	5,404	31.93%	379	2.24%
2022	10,244	66.36%	5,194	33.64%	0	0.00%

Georgia Gubernatorial election results for Bryan County
Year	Republican		Democratic		Third party(ies)	
Year	No.	%	No.	%	No.	%
2022	12,188	71.67%	4,676	27.50%	142	0.83%

== Notable people ==
- Gregg Allman, musician, Allman Brothers Band
- Mattie Belle Davis, first woman judge of Metropolitan Court of Dade County, Florida
- Justin Smiley, pro football player, All-American at University of Alabama
- John Smoltz, MLB pitcher, owned a summer home here while playing for the Atlanta Braves

== See also ==
- National Register of Historic Places listings in Bryan County, Georgia
- List of counties in Georgia
