= Hardwick, Bryan County, Georgia =

Human settlement in United States of America

Hardwick or Hardwicke is a place in Bryan County, Georgia. The town was laid out in 1754. Hardwick was the county seat of Bryan County from 1793 through 1797.
