= Justin Smiley =

American football player (born 1981)

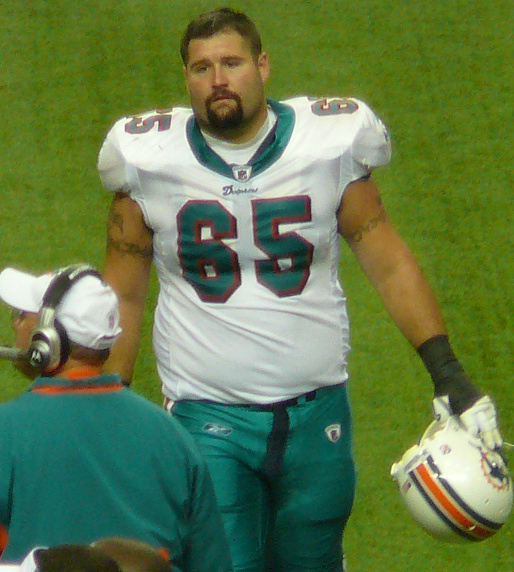
- Smiley with the Miami Dolphins in 2009

No. 65, 66
- Position: Guard

Personal information
- Born: November 11, 1981 (age 45); Ellabell, Georgia, U.S.
- Listed height: 6 ft 3 in (1.91 m)
- Listed weight: 310 lb (141 kg)

Career information
- High school: Southeast Bulloch (Brooklet, Georgia)
- College: Alabama
- NFL draft: 2004: 2nd round, 46th overall pick

Career history
- San Francisco 49ers (2004–2007); Miami Dolphins (2008–2009); Jacksonville Jaguars (2010); Oakland Raiders (2011)*
- * Offseason or practice squad member only

Awards and highlights
- 2× Second-team All-SEC (2002, 2003)

Career NFL statistics
- Games played: 88
- Games started: 78
- Stats at Pro Football Reference

Justin Smiley (born November 11, 1981) is an American former professional football player who was a guard in the National Football League (NFL). He played college football for the Alabama Crimson Tide and was selected by the San Francisco 49ers in the second round of the 2004 NFL draft.

He was also a member of the Miami Dolphins, Jacksonville Jaguars, and Oakland Raiders.

== Professional career ==
Smiley started his professional career on the San Francisco 49ers. Being selected with the 46th overall pick in the second round of the 2004 NFL draft, he played with the Niners until the end of the 2007 NFL season. On February 29, 2008, he was the first player of the 2008 offseason to sign with another team as an unrestricted free agent. He signed a five-year, $25 million contract with $9 million guaranteed with the Miami Dolphins. He was traded to the Jaguars on May 24, 2010.

On July 28, 2011, Smiley was released by the Jacksonville Jaguars. Smiley signed with the Oakland Raiders on August 2. He announced his retirement on August 6.

== Coaching career ==
On September 18, 2011, Smiley returned to Alabama as a coach. Smiley has since decided against coaching.

== Personal life ==
Smiley worked for the Federal Bureau of Prisons at FCI Aliceville, Alabama, but has since resigned. He is married to Amber Smiley and has six children; 4 sons and 2 daughters.
