= Pembroke, Georgia =

- City and County Seat
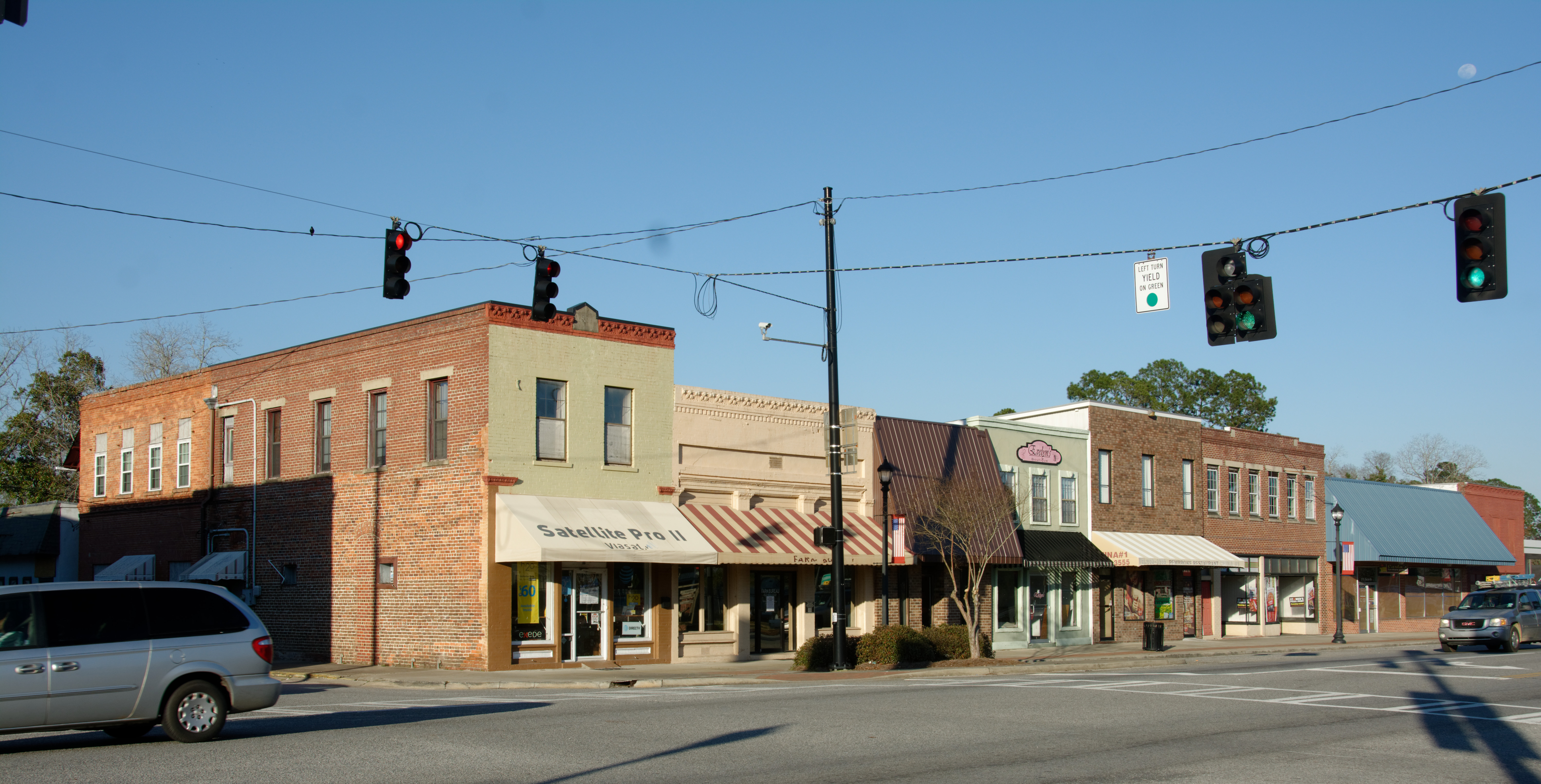
- Pembroke Historic District (2021)

- Seal
- Motto: "A historic railroad town"
- Location in Bryan County and Georgia
- Coordinates: 32°8′24″N 81°37′25″W
- Country: United States
- State: Georgia
- County: Bryan

Government
  - Mayor: Tiffany McCoy Zeigler

Area
  - Total: 7.68 sq mi (19.90 km^{2})
  - Land: 7.64 sq mi (19.79 km^{2})
  - Water: 0.042 sq mi (0.11 km^{2})
- Elevation: 92 ft (28 m)

Population (2020)
  - Total: 2,513
  - Density: 328.9/sq mi (127.0/km^{2})
- Time zone: UTC-5 (Eastern (EST))
  - Summer (DST): UTC-4 (EDT)
- ZIP code: 31321
- Area code: 912
- FIPS code: 13-60004
- GNIS ID: 332632
- Website: pembrokega.net

Pembroke is a city in and the county seat of Bryan County, Georgia, United States. As of the 2020 census, the population of the city was 2,513. It is located approximately 35 miles west of Savannah, Georgia, and approximately 20 miles south of Statesboro, Georgia. Pembroke is part of the Savannah metropolitan statistical area.

== History ==
Pembroke was founded in 1892 as a railroad town and turpentine shipping center. It was named after early resident Pembroke Whitfield Williams. It was incorporated in 1905. The county seat was voted to be moved from Clyde to Pembroke in 1935, with the first County Commissioners session in Pembroke taking place on February 15, 1937.

On April 9, 1998, a F3 tornado damaged the city. It killed two people and injured 17 others along its path.

On April 5, 2022, an EF2 tornado struck the town, causing heavy damage to many structures, trees, and power lines. The tornado would later strengthen to EF4 intensity in Black Creek, causing catastrophic damage, killing one person, and injuring 12 others.

The Pembroke Historic District is listed in the National Register of Historic Places.

== Geography ==
Pembroke is located in northern Bryan County at 32°08′24″N 81°37′25″W. U.S. Route 280 passes through the center of the city, leading east 10 miles (16 km) to Interstate 16 and 35 miles (56 km) to Savannah. Claxton is 16 miles (26 km) to the west.

According to the United States Census Bureau, Pembroke has a total area of 7.7 square miles (19.9 km^{2}), of which 7.6 square miles (19.6 km^{2}) is land and 0.077 square miles (0.2 km^{2}), or 1.17%, is water.

== Demographics ==
Historical population
Census	Pop.	Note	%±
1910	467		—
1920	560		19.9%
1930	788		40.7%
1940	1,039		31.9%
1950	1,171		12.7%
1960	1,450		23.8%
1970	1,361		−6.1%
1980	1,400		2.9%
1990	1,503		7.4%
2000	2,379		58.3%
2010	2,196		−7.7%
2020	2,513		14.4%
U.S. Decennial Census

=== 2020 census ===
As of the 2020 census, Pembroke had a population of 2,513. The median age was 35.4 years. 26.4% of residents were under the age of 18 and 16.3% of residents were 65 years of age or older. For every 100 females there were 86.3 males, and for every 100 females age 18 and over there were 79.9 males age 18 and over.

0.0% of residents lived in urban areas, while 100.0% lived in rural areas.

There were 990 households in Pembroke, including 656 family households. Of all households, 36.8% had children under the age of 18 living in them, 36.6% were married-couple households, 16.7% were households with a male householder and no spouse or partner present, and 38.3% were households with a female householder and no spouse or partner present. About 27.0% of all households were made up of individuals and 12.5% had someone living alone who was 65 years of age or older.

There were 1,087 housing units, of which 8.9% were vacant. The homeowner vacancy rate was 1.7% and the rental vacancy rate was 5.7%.

Pembroke racial composition as of 2020
Race	Num.	Perc.
White (non-Hispanic)	1,308	52.05%
Black or African American (non-Hispanic)	935	37.21%
Native American	2	0.08%
Asian	20	0.8%
Pacific Islander	7	0.28%
Other/Mixed	141	5.61%
Hispanic or Latino	100	3.98%

== Education ==
The Bryan County School District holds pre-school to grade twelve, and consists of five elementary schools, two middle schools and two high schools. The district has 328 full-time teachers and over 5,552 students.

- Bryan County High School
- Richmond Hill High School
- Bryan County Middle School
- Richmond Hill Middle School
- Bryan County Elementary School
- George Washington Carver Elementary School
- Lanier Primary School
- Richmond Hill Elementary School
- Richmond Hill Primary School

== Notable people ==
Pembroke was the birthplace of jazz musician Jabbo Smith.
