= Rock Hill High School =

Rock Hill High School may refer to:

- Rock Hill High School (Ohio), United States
- Rock Hill High School (South Carolina), United States
- Rock Hill High School (Texas), United States
