= Richmond Hill High School (Georgia) =

Public high school in Richmond Hill, Georgia, United States

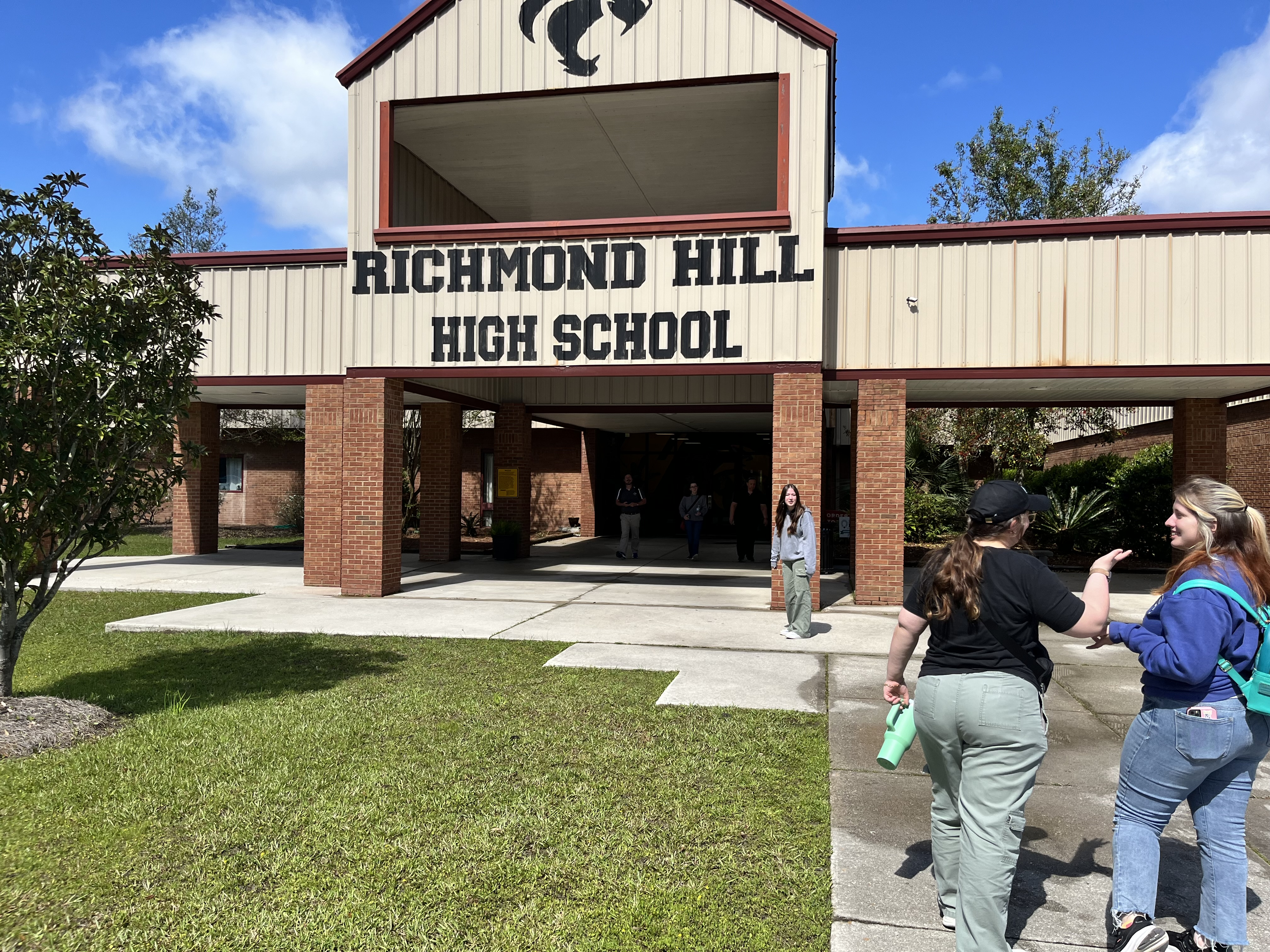

Location
- 500 Wildcat Blvd; Richmond Hill, Bryan County, Georgia 31324; United States; 31°55′33″N 81°18′59″W

Information
- School type: Public
- School board: Bryan County Board of Education
- School district: Bryan County School District
- CEEB code: 112525
- Principal: Bivins Miller
- Faculty: 157
- Teaching staff: 100
- Grades: 9–12
- Enrollment: 2,650 (2023–2024)
- Average class size: 29
- Student to teacher ratio: 20:1
- Colors: Black and gold
- Rivals: Effingham County High School, South Effingham High School
- USNWR ranking: 81
- Website: www.bryan.k12.ga.us/o/rhhs

Richmond Hill High School (RHHS) is a public high school in Richmond Hill, Georgia, United States, which teaches grades 9-12. RHHS is located at 500 Wildcat Blvd, which is named after the school's mascot.

== Sports ==
=== Tennis ===
In 2003, the Richmond Hill boys' tennis team, coached by Pat Paruso, played in the Final Four state tournament in Atlanta, where they lost versus The Westminster Schools. The 2002 Wildcat tennis team also went to the state tournament, but their run ended shortly in the first round.

=== Football ===
Nick Fitzgerald (Class of 2014) was the starting quarterback for the Mississippi State Bulldogs of the Southeastern Conference from 2016 to 2018, compiling over 6,000 career passing yards and over 3,500 career rushing yards. Fitzgerald spent time on the rosters of the Tampa Bay Buccaneers (NFL), the St. Louis Battlehawks (XFL), and TSL Sea Lions (TSL) during his professional career.

On April 28, 2018, former RHHS and Middle Tennessee State University kicker Canon Rooker signed an undrafted free-agent deal with the New York Jets.

=== State titles ===
- Boys' Basketball (3) - 1988(A), 1993(A), 1994(A)
- Boys' Cross Country (1) - 2021(6A)
- Duals Wrestling (1) - 2018(6A)
- Traditional Wrestling (1) - 2018(6A)

== Notable alumni ==
- Nick Fitzgerald
