= Black Creek, Georgia =

Unincorporated community in Bryan County, Georgia, United States

Coordinates: 32°09′59″N 81°29′22″W

Black Creek is an unincorporated community in Bryan County, Georgia, United States. It is located along U.S. Route 280, 2 miles (3 km) southwest of Interstate 16 and 9 miles (14 km) northeast of Pembroke. Black Creek is the location of the arms manufacturer Daniel Defense.

== History ==
On April 5, 2022, the town was hit by a violent EF4 tornado, which heavily damaged or completely destroyed multiple homes, mobile homes, and other structures while producing widespread damage to trees, power lines, and power poles. One person was killed and twelve others were injured.
