= National Register of Historic Places listings in Allendale County, South Carolina =

Location of Allendale County in South Carolina

This is a list of the National Register of Historic Places listings in Allendale County, South Carolina.

This is intended to be a complete list of the properties and districts on the National Register of Historic Places in Allendale County, South Carolina, United States. The locations of National Register properties and districts for which the latitude and longitude coordinates are included below may be seen in a map.

There are 14 properties and districts listed on the National Register in the county.

This National Park Service list is complete through NPS recent listings posted October 23, 2026.

== Current listings ==
	Name on the Register	Image	Date listed	Location	City or town	Description
1	Allendale Chert Quarries Archeological District		September 28, 1985 (#85002699)	Address Restricted	Martin	
2	Allendale County Courthouse	Allendale County Courthouse	August 1, 2007 (#06000580)	292 Barnwell Highway; 33°00′46″N 81°18′22″W	Allendale	
3	Allendale Training School		June 10, 2022 (#100007773)	4561 Allendale-Fairfax Hwy. 33°00′03″N 81°18′00″W	Allendale	Equalization Schools in South Carolina, 1951-1960 MPS
4	Antioch Christian Church	Antioch Christian Church	December 12, 1977 (#77001212)	Southwest of Allendale on South Carolina Highway 3; 32°56′52″N 81°24′54″W	Allendale vicinity	
5	Colding-Walker House	Colding-Walker House	April 30, 1998 (#98000415)	South Carolina Highway 52; 33°02′30″N 81°21′56″W	Appleton	
6	Erwin House	Erwin House	May 7, 1976 (#76001687)	Southwest of Allendale off U.S. Route 301; 32°57′25″N 81°24′56″W	Allendale vicinity	
7	Fennell Hill		November 19, 1974 (#74001820)	Address Restricted	Peeples	
8	Gravel Hill Plantation	Gravel Hill Plantation	May 28, 1976 (#76001688)	3954 Augusta Stage Coach Road, Garnett, South Carolina; 32°58′04″N 81°23′18″W	Allendale vicinity	
9	Lawton Mounds		June 19, 1972 (#72001185)	Address Restricted	Johnson's Landing	
10	Red Bluff Flint Quarries		June 22, 1972 (#72001184)	Address Restricted	Allendale vicinity	
11	Roselawn	Roselawn	May 28, 1976 (#76001689)	3 miles southwest of Allendale on South Carolina Highway 47; 32°58′58″N 81°20′51″W	Allendale vicinity	
12	Smyrna Baptist Church	Smyrna Baptist Church	May 28, 1976 (#76001691)	South of Allendale on South Carolina Highway 22; 32°56′11″N 81°21′07″W	Allendale vicinity	
13	Williams House		February 17, 1999 (#99000104)	U.S. Route 321, near Ulmer; 33°05′06″N 81°12′25″W	Ulmer	There is a major error in the NRHP form coordinates.
14	Virginia Durant Young House	Virginia Durant Young House	August 8, 1983 (#83002183)	U.S. Route 278; 32°57′35″N 81°14′20″W	Fairfax	Now houses the Fairfax Public Library

== See also ==
- List of National Historic Landmarks in South Carolina
- National Register of Historic Places listings in South Carolina
