= Hurricane Isaias (2026) =

Category 3 Atlantic hurricane in 2026

- Isaias approaching the Florida panhandle shortly after peak intensity on October 9

Meteorological history
- Formed: October 6, 2026
- Post-tropical: October 10, 2026
- Dissipated: October 12, 2026

Category 3 major hurricane
- 1-minute sustained (SSHWS/NWS)
- Highest winds: 120 mph (195 km/h)
- Lowest pressure: 958 mbar (hPa); 28.29 inHg

Overall effects
- Fatalities: 9 total
- Damage: ≥$2 billion (2026 USD)
- Areas affected: Eastern Mexico; Eastern United States; Particularly Florida and Alabama
- IBTrACS /
- Part of the 2026 Atlantic hurricane season

Hurricane Isaias (/ˌisɑːˈiːɑːs/ ee-sah-EE-ahss) was a strong and destructive tropical cyclone that caused significant impacts to the Southeastern United States in early October 2026. Upon reaching hurricane status early on October 8, it tied the record for the latest date of the formation of the first Atlantic hurricane of a season set in 1905. In addition, it was the first hurricane to make landfall in the United States since Hurricane Milton exactly two years prior. The ninth named storm, first hurricane, and first major hurricane of the 2026 Atlantic hurricane season, Isaias originated from a low-pressure area over the southwestern portion of the Gulf of Mexico on October 6. After developing into a tropical storm, Isaias steadily strengthened while moving northeastward towards the Gulf Coast. It became a hurricane on October 8, before quickly strengthening and peaked in intensity as a major hurricane on October 9. Increasingly unfavorable conditions caused Isaias to weaken slightly before making landfall near Destin, Florida, later that night, before rapidly weakening and becoming post-tropical the following morning on October 10 over Alabama, before dissipating on October 12. Its remnants were absorbed into a new system that moved towards Iceland where it underwent explosive cyclogenesis on October 14, and eventually set the lowest October pressure in Iceland and caused blizzards in Greenland.

Because of projections of landfall in the United States, the approaching storm was expected to have significant impacts on most of the Gulf Coast, including widespread evacuations in Florida, Alabama, and Mississippi, as well as the closure of significant infrastructure. One estimate suggested that 63% of the Gulf of Mexico's oil production—1,300,000 barrels per day—was paused.

In combination with a cold front, the predecessor to Isaias caused significant damage to Tamaulipas and Veracruz including floods, downed trees, and power outages. Nine fatalities have been confirmed as a result of Isaias, all in the United States: six in Florida, two in Alabama, and another in South Carolina. Insured losses in the United States were expected to surpass $2 billion (2026 USD).

== Meteorological history ==
Map plotting the storm's track and intensity, according to the Saffir–Simpson scale Map key Saffir–Simpson scale Tropical depression (≤38 mph, ≤62 km/h) Tropical storm (39–73 mph, 63–118 km/h) Category 1 (74–95 mph, 119–153 km/h) Category 2 (96–110 mph, 154–177 km/h) Category 3 (111–129 mph, 178–208 km/h) Category 4 (130–156 mph, 209–251 km/h) Category 5 (≥157 mph, ≥252 km/h) Unknown Storm type Tropical cyclone Subtropical cyclone Extratropical cyclone, remnant low, tropical disturbance, or monsoon depression

On October 3, the National Hurricane Center (NHC) began to monitor the southwestern Gulf of Mexico for a low-pressure area that was expected to develop. Two days later, a trough developed along the Gulf Coast of Mexico, producing an area of thunderstorms. Wind shear over the Gulf of Mexico was also weakened in comparison to how it had been throughout the rest of the season, which was itself higher than average due to the 2026–2027 El Niño event. On October 10, as the system became more organized, On October 6 at 21:00 UTC, the system developed a closed circulation and was designated as Tropical Depression Nine. Around that point in time, the system was moving slowly eastward as a result of a trough, and the convection was found mostly to the north. Environmental conditions for the cyclone were generally favorable with moderate southwesterly shear being offset by high oceanic heat content, moist mid-level relative humidity levels, and upper-level divergence. At 09:00 UTC on October 7, the system reached tropical storm strength, and was named Isaias.

The storm strengthened steadily over the next day despite some shear displacing the low and mid-level centers, and the storm was upgraded to a hurricane at 03:30 UTC on October 8 based on data collected by hurricane hunters—the first of the 2026 season. A faster rate of intensification ensued as the hurricane turned more to the northeast, and the following day on October 9, Isaias reached its peak intensity of 120 mph (195 km/h) and a central pressure of 958 mbar (28.3 inHg) as an eye began emerging, whereupon it became a Category 3 major hurricane. Increasingly hostile wind shear induced weakening as the hurricane began to accelerate towards the Florida Panhandle, resulting in a asymmetric structure with the bulk of the convective activity becoming displaced to the north and northwest of the eye with a partial eyewall. Isaias then made landfall at 01:30 UTC on October 10 near Destin, Florida, as a Category 2 hurricane with winds of 105 mph (169 km/h) and a pressure of 971 mbar (28.7 inHg). As the night progressed and Isaias tracked inland into southern Alabama, the system began to rapidly degrade in intensity and signatures on weather radar and became a post-tropical cyclone at 06:00 UTC. The surface center dissipated a day later on October 12. A new area of low pressure formed within the storm’s remnants, absorbed the remnants of Isaias and proceeded to undergo explosive cyclogenesis near Iceland on October 14. The storm moved over Northern Europe until it finally dissipated on October 19, over Siberia.

=== Forecasting distinctions ===
In forecasting Isaias, the NHC relied particularly heavily on models based on artificial intelligence (AI). Early in the system's life, physics-based models, including the Global Forecast System and Integrated Forecasting System, were indicating a landfall in Louisiana or Mississippi as a tropical storm. The AI models, such as Google DeepMind's model, preferred a landfall location in Alabama or Florida with the possibility of Isaias attaining major hurricane status. The AI models also made these predictions before Isaias had underwent tropical cyclogenesis. Forecasters, such as the director of the NHC, also noted that AI models allowed for more "bullish" predictions, jumping straight to higher intensity categories instead of slowly increasing strength predictions.

== Preparations ==
=== Mexico ===
In Tzitzapollo, 60 people were evacuated due a risk of landslides caused by the preceding disturbance. Shelters were opened in other towns of Veracruz to support evacuees. Across five states—Campeche, Tabasco, Tamaulipas, Veracruz, and Yucatán—over two dozen ports were closed, including Tampico, Progreso, and Campeche. Classes in Campeche were suspended. In Isla Arena, the school was converted into a shelter. The community was also placed under three evacuation orders, with 23 people taking a minibus out of the town. A total of 68 storm shelters were opened in the city of Mérida as well as in Celestún and Progreso. Multiple families were evacuated from flood-prone areas in Celestún. Twenty-seven municipalities of Yucatán halted nonessential work and several had classes also suspended. Hundreds of fishermen ceased working in Campeche. Around 2,800 personnel in Plan DN-III-E were deployed to the Yucatán Peninsula.

=== United States ===
Isaias approaching the Florida panhandle on weather radar

On October 7, hurricane watches were issued for the coasts of Alabama, Mississippi, and the Florida panhandle, and tropical storm watches extended from Florida to the Mississippi River Delta. Soon after, many of those watches were upgraded to warnings. Widespread tornado watches were also issued. Chevron Corporation began evacuating nonessential workers from oil platforms in the Gulf of Mexico. Shell plc evacuated five oil rigs. In total, 63% of the Gulf of Mexico's oil production, 1,300,000 barrels per day, was paused. In addition, 56% of natural gas production in the region was suspended. To limit the impact of Isaias, President Donald Trump approved releasing some oil from the United States's strategic reserves. Amtrak suspended the Mardi Gras Service from October 8–11 because of the storm and truncated its Crescent to Atlanta with service to and from New Orleans being provided via a bus bridge on October 7–8; no alternate transportation was offered on October 9–11. DoorDash suspended delivery operations across parts of the Florida Panhandle, Alabama, Mississippi, and Louisiana due to Isaias. Gulf Islands National Seashore closed before the arrival of Isaias. The American Red Cross organized a large operation across the Gulf Coast of the United States, opening 21 shelters and housing over a thousand people.

==== Florida ====
Florida governor Ron DeSantis issued a state of emergency for 25 counties ahead of the storm. The Florida National Guard was also activated, 5,000 soldiers aiding. with Local governments in northwestern Florida also declared their own states of emergency. On October 7, mandatory evacuation orders were issued in Okaloosa County. Public transportation in the county was shut down. Alligator Point, Bald Point, Dog Island, and St. George Island also each had mandatory evacuation orders placed on them. Destin–Fort Walton Beach Airport and Pensacola International Airport closed. Uber partnered with the state to give free service on any round trip valued less than $40. Multiple school districts in the Florida Panhandle cancelled classes due to Isaias. The Mississippi State University basketball exhibition being played in Pensacola against Florida State University on October 10 was cancelled. Several high school football games in the region were also rescheduled. The Marco Patriots readied supplies and truck for deployment to communities struck by Isaias. Some events in Tampa Bay, including the metropolitan area's celebration of Oktoberfest, were postponed. In response to Isaias and another weather system earlier, some communities in that area also prepared tools against flooding, including clearing and grading canals and drainage ditches. All Waffle House locations in Escambia and Santa Rosa counties were closed on the morning of October 9, setting the informal Waffle House Index to “red” (the highest on the scale).

As Isaias moved ashore, an extreme wind warning was issued for southern Escambia, Okaloosa, Santa Rosa, and Walton counties.

==== Alabama and Mississippi ====
Rains over Birmingham, Alabama, due to Isaias

Kay Ivey, the governor of Alabama, issued a state of emergency for 40 of the state's counties. Dauphin Island issued evacuation orders and shut down water service. Sites across Alabama and Mississippi were opened for residents to fill sandbags. Shelters were opened in Jackson County, Mississippi, where a voluntary evacuation was ordered before being cancelled due to decreasing storm surge forecasts. Harrison County also opened shelters which would house 53 people. Mobile issued a curfew. Mobile Regional Airport ceased operations. The United States Post Service suspended services in parts of Alabama and Mississippi. Two festivals in Southern Alabama had changes in schedule due to concerns over Isaias. Multiple school districts in southern Alabama and Mississippi cancelled classes due to Isaias. Several high school and collegiate American football games in the region were rescheduled. Gulf State Park closed before the arrival of Isaias. The Coast Transit Authority halted service. Drawbridges operated by the Mississippi Department of Transportation, including one on I-110, were closed for marine traffic. Panic buying of gasoline was reported in Alabama, associated with an increase in prices partially from an escalation in the 2026 Iran war. Two oil refineries were also brought offline, totaling 2.5% of the nation's capacity. President Trump cancelled a visit to a Georgia–Alabama college football game in Tuscaloosa. The University of Alabama imposed a temporary ban of tailgating until storm conditions passed.

==== Elsewhere ====
The governor of Georgia, Brian Kemp, declared a state of emergency. Evacuation sites were opened in Albany and Moultrie. Atlanta Pride was pushed back due to expected inclement weather. The Que Pasa Fest in New Orleans, Louisiana, was cancelled due to Isaias. A voluntary evacuation order was issued in part of Venice over concerns of storm surge flooding. Shelters were also opened in North Carolina.

== Impact ==
=== Mexico ===
Isaias and its precursor combined with a cold front produced rainfall in the state of Tamaulipas only a week after a previous flood event. Rainfall totals of 1 inch (25 mm) to 3 inches (76 mm) fell in Matamoros. Several roads were flooded in the city. Floods resulted in the suspension of classes at six schools in Matamoros. In northern Veracruz, 25 municipalities reported some sort of impact including downed trees, damaged homes, and overflowing rivers. Several towns in Zontecomatlán reported having degraded access. A bridge connecting the aforementioned municipality to Xoxocapa was damaged.

Before the tropical cyclone formed, Yucatán's soils were already well saturated, increasing the flood threat. Strong winds and surf in Campeche downed eight palapas and caused beach erosion in Sabancuy. A road connecting Isla Arena became flooded. During the passage of Isaias, authorities reported power and water outages in Campeche, with storm conditions from Isaias inhibiting recovery. The overflow of a swamp in Celestún flooded several homes, affecting 200 families.

=== United States ===
==== Florida ====
Outer bands of Isaias at Levy Bay, Florida

Downed pine trees in East Milton, Florida

In Florida, Santa Rosa Sound recorded a sustained wind of 91 mph (146 km/h) and a gust to 116 mph (187 km/h). At Oriole Beach, a Texas Tech "sticknet" instrument recorded sustained winds of 95 mph (153 km/h) and a gust to 116 mph (187 km/h). Pensacola's city hall reported a wind gust of 102 mph (164 km/h). In Pensacola and Milton, there were reports of roofs being blown off by Isaias. There were also reports of property damage in Gulf Breeze and Navarre as a result of wind. Pensacola International Airport suffered some damage. Dangerous conditions forced several communities in Florida to temporarily suspend emergency response. These conditions also forced the closure of the Theo Baars Bridge, Bob Sikes Bridge, and Pensacola Bay Bridge. A wind gust of 118 mph (190 km/h) was measured in Jay, causing extensive tree damage in the nearby area. Panama City recorded a 5.51 ft (1.68 m) storm surge as the storm passed, while Niceville recorded 8.06 in (205 mm) of rain. About 450,000 customers lost power in Florida, according to Governor DeSantis. After having power restored, an outlet overload caused a house fire in Escambia County. Power outages also forced Escambia County School District and Santa Rosa County District Schools to extend class suspensions. Jackson County experienced damage to crops. One of the largest magnolia trees in the United States and the largest one within the state was downed by Isaias.

Six deaths were reported from Isaias in Florida. A man died after running a generator inside his home. Several members of his family were also hospitalized. One woman was killed by the storm when a tree fell on her home in Escambia County. There was one fatal traffic related incident which was caused by a malfunctioning stoplight broken by Isaias.

As of November 9, 2026, total insurance claims in Florida totaled over $700 million. In Pensacola alone, the mayor of the city estimated that at least $70 million of property damage had been caused by Isaias. Escambia County estimated that debris pickup within would cost $55 million while property damage to county builds was around $64 million. County officials in Santa Rosa County estimated property damage around $250 million, finding that damage was extremely widespread. Around 100 structures in the county were destroyed and another 400 had severe damage. Around 41,000 homeowners submitted insurance claims to cover for damages that the hurricane caused.

==== Deep South ====
In Alabama, over 300,000 customers were without power. Rainfall totals reached 12.97 in (329 mm) in Bellwood. One person died in Birmingham after a tree fell onto their home. Another person was killed in Barbour County due to a fallen tree that resulted in a motor vehicle crash. A tree also injured a sheriff in Dale County and another trapped a family in a home in Greenville. Fallen trees and power lines resulted in the closure of all roads in surrounding Dothan, Alabama, in Houston County. Some homes were destroyed in the state.

Due to impacts from Isaias's approach in Mississippi, Ingalls Shipbuilding had to cease activities earlier than anticipated on October 9. Poor weather conditions in the region caused flight disruptions at Gulfport–Biloxi International Airport, with flights canceled for the afternoon of October 9. Around 18,000 customers in Mississippi lost power.

Roads in Shell Beach, Louisiana, were inundated by coastal flooding. That community experienced the highest storm surge from Isaias outside of Florida at 3.89 feet (1.19 m). Water also flooded the New Orleans lakefront, including Venetian Isles, located outside New Orleans's levees, which had its roads entirely submerged. A total of 4,000 customers lost power at some point during Isaias in New Orleans.

Over 126,000 customers lost power across Georgia. Up to 4 in (100 mm) of rain fell in Metro Atlanta, and Hartsfield–Jackson Atlanta International Airport recorded 2.25 in (57 mm) of rain.

The highest rainfall from Isaias in South Carolina was recorded at Rocky Bottom with 5.08 inches (129 mm) of rain. Some rivers in Upstate South Carolina swelled significantly from that rain. One man died in Ninety Six, after a tree fell onto his home.

==== Elsewhere ====
Wind gusts in the Tennessee Valley peaked around 60 mph (97 km/h). Thousands of cubic yards of debris were cleaned up in Tennessee after Isaias. Around 6,660 customers lost power in Tennessee.

Some parts of North Carolina received over nine inches (230 mm), with Spruce Pine reporting 9.49 inches (241 mm). Rain from Isaias in North Carolina caused rivers to overflow. In Burke County, two people camping were rescued after becoming caught in the Catawba River. Power outages occurred in western North Carolina. Flooding forced several roads in the state to close, including NC 9. Rain from Isaias partially alleviated drought conditions. In McDowell County, first responders reported five landslides. Wind gusts in the state also reached 67 mph (108 km/h) atop Mount Mitchell.

In Maryland, Cape St. Clair received the most rain in the state at 5.23 inches (133 mm). Wind gusts in Oakland reached 37 mph (60 km/h). Hillsborough Township, New Jersey, reported 2.74 inches (70 mm) of rain while 13 other counties reported over two inches (51 mm). Berlin, Connecticut, had its state's highest rainfall total from Isaias: 2.46 inches (62 mm). In Massachusetts, the peak accumulation was 2.87 in (73 mm) in Shrewsbury. The majority of the New York Metropolitan Area received around an inch (25 mm) of rainfall.

==== Tornadoes ====
Radar loop of Isaias's landfall and the subsequent tornado outbreak

A tornado outbreak occurred in the United States from October 9–11 as a result of Isaias. The outbreak primarily occurred in Georgia, South Carolina, and North Carolina, with an EF0 tornado taking place in Florida on October 9. The strongest and most destructive tornado of the outbreak was an EF2 that occurred near Beulaville, North Carolina that caused widespread damage across Duplin County. A high-end EF1 tornado occurred near Allendale, South Carolina, that damaged four homes and destroyed an outbuilding. At least seven tornadoes touched down in central North Carolina including three in Wake County, one each in Clayton/Johnston County, Fayetteville/Cumberland County, Montgomery County, and a short-lived EF0 tornado in Sampson County. Overall, 24 tornadoes were confirmed in the outbreak.

Confirmed tornadoes by Enhanced Fujita rating
EFU	EF0	EF1	EF2	EF3	EF4	EF5	Total
0	8	11	5	0	0	0	24

===== October 9 event =====
List of confirmed tornadoes – Friday, October 9, 2026 (Note: All dates are based on the local time zone where the tornado touched down; however, all times are in Coordinated Universal Time for consistency.)
EF#	Location	County / Parish	State	Start Coord.	Time (UTC)	Path length	Max width
EF0	Eastern Eastpoint	Franklin	FL	29.7573°N 84.8324°W	21:42–21:46	0.97 mi (1.56 km)	230 yd (210 m)
EF0	This tornadic waterspout moved ashore near the US 98/SR 65 intersection and inflicted minor damage to homes before dissipating.						

===== October 10 event =====
List of confirmed tornadoes – Saturday, October 10, 2026
EF#	Location	County / Parish	State	Start Coord.	Time (UTC)	Path length	Max width
EF0	E of Statesboro	Bulloch	GA	32.46°N 81.67°W	18:12–18:13	1.05 mi (1.69 km)	25 yd (23 m)
EF0	A high-end EF0 tornado uprooted large trees, snapped large tree branches, and damaged a pivot irrigation system.						
EF0	WNW of Newington	Screven	GA	32.6009°N 81.5784°W	18:42–18:46	1.51 mi (2.43 km)	25 yd (23 m)
EF0	This tornado snapped off branches of hardwood and softwood trees and a standalone garage's tin roof was peeled off.						
EF1	SW of Newington to E of Sylvania	Screven	GA	32.5714°N 81.5427°W	19:12–19:36	10.54 mi (16.96 km)	200 yd (180 m)
EF1	This tornado caused extensive tree damage; numerous large trees, both hardwood and softwood, were either snapped or uprooted. A mobile home and several cars were crushed by falling trees.						
EF1	W of Waynesboro	Burke	GA	33.09°N 82.1319°W	19:30–19:44	3.03 mi (4.88 km)	350 yd (320 m)
EF1	This tornado caused significant damage to a farmstead, including roof damage, uprooted trees, a toppled center-pivot irrigation system, and multiple tipped over 18-wheeler trailers. Subsequent damage was primarily to trees and tree limbs.						
EF1	W of Allendale	Allendale	SC	32.945°N 81.3965°W	20:15–20:28	5.58 mi (8.98 km)	350 yd (320 m)
EF1	This tornado significantly damaged four homes. One home had its aluminum roofing and front porch damaged, another had complete roof and outer wall failure, and the other two had minor roofing damage. Additionally, two carports and an outbuilding were destroyed. The tornado continued north into wooded areas and caused tree damage.						
EF1	N of Appleton to western Kline	Allendale, Barnwell	SC	33.0771°N 81.3612°W	20:34–20:49	5.07 mi (8.16 km)	200 yd (180 m)
EF1	A tornado touched down in a wooded area and rapidly tracked northward, snapping and uprooting clusters of hardwood and softwood trees along its path. It continued north into Barnwell County, passing through the western outskirts of Kline and producing additional tree damage in forested areas before dissipating.						
EF2	N of Kline to Barnwell to Williston	Barnwell	SC	33.1579°N 81.3550°W	20:49–21:27	18.04 mi (29.03 km)	100 yd (91 m)
EF2	This strong tornado caused sporadic tree damage along its lengthy path; multiple hardwood trees were uprooted or snapped and power poles were downed.						
EF1	W of Wagener	Aiken	SC	33.6127°N 81.4597°W	20:49–21:23	3.22 mi (5.18 km)	150 yd (140 m)
EF1	This tornado sporadically snapped and uprooted trees.						

===== October 11 event =====
List of confirmed tornadoes – Sunday, October 11, 2026
EF#	Location	County / Parish	State	Start Coord.	Time (UTC)	Path length	Max width
EF2	W of Blair	Newberry, Fairfield	SC	34.4083°N 81.4342°W	10:05–10:10	2.66 mi (4.28 km)	450 yd (410 m)
EF2	A strong tornado occurred within southern portions of Sumter National Forest and initially snapped and uprooted several pine trees before moving northeast through a wooded area where numerous more trees were damaged. At one residence, several large pine trees were snapped or uprooted and a small camper was overturned. The tornado strengthened as it approached the Broad River, destroying large portions of the surrounding forest, with numerous pine trees snapped and several power poles brought down by falling trees and power lines. The tornado then crossed the Broad River, snapping more trees before dissipating in a densely forested area.						
EF2	Northeastern Candor	Montgomery	NC	35.2999°N 79.7369°W	14:14–14:15	0.62 mi (1.00 km)	125 yd (114 m)
EF2	This short-lived but strong tornado formed and downed numerous trees before tracking northeast, reaching peak intensity as it collapsed three walls of a community center and snapped nearby softwood trees. The tornado then tracked across a small pond, snapping more trees and damaging the roof of a residence before dissipating right before reaching I-73/I-74/US 220. This is the first tornado that has occurred in Montgomery County since 2004.						
EF2	Northwestern Fayetteville	Cumberland	NC	35.0713°N 78.969°W	15:56–16:05	5.3 mi (8.5 km)	150 yd (140 m)
EF2	This strong tornado touched down and knocked over several trees and tore away HVAC units from a business before likely lifting briefly and touching back down. The tornado then intensifed as it passed over a Walmart, removing around 10 HVAC units from the roof. The tornado then passed between two hotels, bending two poles, damaging roofs, and rolling a couple of cars. The tornado then tracked through a parking lot, displacing and lifting around a dozen vehicles, with one person sustaining a minor injury. The tornado then weakened and produced intermittent damage, with one area having around a dozen trees snapped. The tornado continued to inflict damage, crossing a lake and snapping more trees before lifting prior to reaching I-295.						
EF1	W of New Hill	Chatham	NC	35.6804°N 79.0098°W	16:02–16:03	1.07 mi (1.72 km)	50 yd (46 m)
EF1	A high-end EF1 tornado snapped numerous trees along the southeastern shoreline of Jordan Lake.						
EF0	NE of Clarendon	Columbus	NC	34.2336°N 78.822°W	16:03–16:04	0.13 mi (0.21 km)	20 yd (18 m)
EF0	This brief and narrow tornado destroyed several open farm buildings and shifted an empty grain bin off its foundation. Sheet metal roofing was scattered into tree canopies and fields along its path.						
EF1	WNW of Linden	Cumberland, Harnett	NC	35.2595°N 78.7787°W	16:23–16:30	2.36 mi (3.80 km)	100 yd (91 m)
EF1	A tornado touched down just west of Linden and tracked northeast inflicting minor roof and fence damage to several homes. The most significant damage occurred in a residential area where several homes had approximately half of their windows blown out, fence posts embedded in concrete were pulled from the ground, and windblown timber punctured exterior walls. The tornado continued northeast across an open field, leaving a visible path through a dormant cornfield and snapping or uprooting several softwood trees. Further along its path, additional trees were knocked down and an anchored carport was torn from the ground and thrown 30–50 yd (27–46 m). The tornado then crossed a small pond, knocking down a few more trees before dissipating over a former airstrip.						
EF1	Western Cary	Wake	NC	35.8147°N 78.865°W	16:29–16:30	0.37 mi (0.60 km)	50 yd (46 m)
EF1	A large tree and multiple large tree branches were snapped.						
EF0	NE of Clegg	Wake	NC	35.8788°N 78.8153°W	16:40	0.16 mi (0.26 km)	50 yd (46 m)
EF0	This very brief tornado snapped a tree and uprooted others						
EF0	Western East Arcadia	Bladen	NC	34.3718°N 78.3429°W	16:54–16:58	1.68 mi (2.70 km)	235 yd (215 m)
EF0	This broad and intermittent tornado damaged trees.						
EF1	Northeastern Raleigh	Wake	NC	35.8492°N 78.5401°W	17:12–17:17	2.51 mi (4.04 km)	150 yd (140 m)
EF1	This tornado touched down on the northeast outskirts of Raleigh and began to snap multiple trees and uplifted a trampoline before crossing I-540. Reaching maximum intensity, several homes sustained roof damage and numerous hardwood trees were snapped and uprooted. The tornado then weakened and dissipated shortly after.						
EF0	Eastern Clayton	Johnston	NC	35.6341°N 78.4423°W	17:15–17:22	3.33 mi (5.36 km)	75 yd (69 m)
EF0	An intermittent tornado snapped and uprooted trees, broke large branches, and caused minor shingle and roof damage to several homes and other structures. Numerous fences were blown over and several power poles were snapped or knocked down. In Clayton, the tornado also damaged patio furniture and signage at a gas station near the intersection of NC 36/NC 42 and US 70 before dissipating.						
EF0	SE of Harrells	Sampson	NC	34.6912°N 78.1654°W	17:25–17:27	1.17 mi (1.88 km)	30 yd (27 m)
EF0	This brief tornado snapped tree branches.						
EF1	SW of Louisburg	Franklin	NC	36.0465°N 78.3702°W	17:40–17:47	3.85 mi (6.20 km)	130 yd (120 m)
EF1	This high-end EF1 tornado uprooted multiple softwood and hardwood trees. A barn also lost the majority of its roof and fencing.						
EF2	Northern Wallace to Beulaville to Potters Hill	Duplin	NC	34.7395°N 78.0342°W	17:38–18:27	24.43 mi (39.32 km)	150 yd (140 m)
EF2	A strong tornado initially touched down south of NC 41, snapping and uprooting several trees and causing minor damage to a home before crossing the highway where additional trees were snapped and a farm outbuilding sustained roof damage. The tornado rapidly intensified, completely displacing a well-anchored two-car garage from its foundation, embedding a large branch into a nearby home's roof, and severely damaging a metal building whose heavy doors were torn off and thrown over the residence. Continuing northeast across US 117 and I-40, the tornado snapped additional trees, damaged multiple farms, bent power poles, and broke windows at a church. After crossing NC 50, the tornado intensified again, shifting an attached garage off its foundation and dragging a nearby truck while several large hardwood trees were snapped at their bases. Further northeast, the tornado produced significant damage at a pig farm, completely destroying a barn and ripping a feed silo weighing over 1,000 pounds (450 kg) from its concrete anchors. The tornado continued through inaccessible wooded and swampy areas toward Beulaville where additional trees were snapped and uprooted before the damage became more sporadic. Minor damage occurred in Beulaville and the final documented damage consisted of minor roof damage in Potters Hill where the tornado then dissipated.						
EF1	SSE of Kinston	Jones	NC	35.1018°N 77.5592°W	18:48–18:56	3.52 mi (5.66 km)	125 yd (114 m)
EF1	This tornado completely destroyed an outbuilding. Trees and power lines were also damaged.						

== Aftermath ==
After the storm, President Trump issued a federal disaster declaration for dozens of Georgia's counties and eight within Florida. For Florida, it was noted that Trump took a longer period of time compared to normal to approve any declaration. Governor DeSantis approved a loan for 65 businesses valued at $4.5 million. Florida undertook a supplies distribution program, giving out hundreds of thousands of supplies. Senator Rick Scott of Florida donated a quarter of his salary to a charity to aid in recovery.

== See also ==
- Weather of 2026
- Tropical cyclones in 2026
- Other storms of the same name
- List of Category 3 Atlantic hurricanes
- List of Mexico hurricanes
- List of United States hurricanes
- List of Florida hurricanes (2000–present)
- List of United States tornadoes in October 2026
- Hurricane Ethel (1960) – Another Category 3 hurricane that took a similar track to Isaias and affected similar areas
