= South Carolina Highway 73 (1940s) =

Former state highway in South Carolina, United States

South Carolina Highway 73

Route information
- Maintained by SCDOT
- Existed: 1942–1947

Major junctions
- West end: SR 73 at the Georgia state line southwest of Allendale
- SC 337 in Allendale; SC 3 in Allendale; SC 28 in Allendale
- East end: SC 5 / SC 641 in Sycamore

Location
- Country: United States
- State: South Carolina
- Counties: Allendale

Highway system
- South Carolina State Highway System; Interstate; US; State; Scenic
← SC 72	→ SC 75

South Carolina Highway 73 (SC 73) was a state highway that existed in central portions of Allendale County. It connected the Georgia state line with Sycamore, via Allendale.

== Route description ==
SC 32 began at the Georgia state line, southwest of Allendale, where it continued as SC 73. It proceeded to the northeast. It had an intersection with SC 631 (now SC 3) before it reached Allendale. In the town, it first met SC 337 (now Bluff Road). Then, in rapid succession, it intersected SC 3's then-current path (now partially US 278) and SC 28's then-current path (now US 278 and SC 125). Just northeast of Allendale, it met the southern terminus of SC 508 (now US 301). It then proceeded to Sycamore, where it reached its eastern terminus, an intersection with SC 5 (now US 321) and what was then the western terminus of SC 641.

== History ==
SC 73 was established in 1942 as a renumbering of the original SC 331. It was decommissioned in 1947. Most of its path became part of US 301 from the state line to Allendale and part of an extended SC 641 from there to Sycamore

== Major intersections ==
County	Location	mi	km	Destinations	Notes
Screven				SR 73 south	Continuation of roadway into Georgia
Georgia state line				Southern terminus at a crossing of the Savannah River	
Allendale				SC 631	Now SC 3
Allendale	Allendale			SC 337	Now Bluff Road
Allendale	Allendale			SC 3	Now partially US 278
Allendale	Allendale			SC 28	Now US 278 and SC 125
Allendale				SC 508 north	Southern terminus of SC 508; now US 301 north
Allendale	Sycamore			SC 5 / SC 641 east	Eastern terminus of SC 73; western terminus of SC 641; SC 5 is now US 321.
1.000 mi = 1.609 km; 1.000 km = 0.621 mi
