= South Carolina Highway 641 =

State highway in South Carolina, United States

South Carolina Highway 641

Route information
- Maintained by SCDOT
- Length: 21.560 mi (34.697 km)
- Existed: 1932–present

Major junctions
- West end: US 301 near Allendale
- US 321 in Sycamore; US 601 near Ehrhardt
- East end: SC 64 near Lodge

Location
- Country: United States
- State: South Carolina
- Counties: Allendale, Bamberg, Colleton

Highway system
- South Carolina State Highway System; Interstate; US; State; Scenic
← SC 602	→ SC 642

South Carolina Highway 641 (SC 641) is a 21.560-mile (34.697 km) primary state highway in the U.S. state of South Carolina. It provides the city of Allendale with a direct route toward Charleston, via SC 64 and U.S. Route 17 (US 17). It also serves access to Rivers Bridge State Park.

== History ==
The highway was established around 1932 as a new primary spur of SC 64 to SC 36 (today US 601). By 1938, SC 641 was extended west on new routing to SC 33/SC 331 (today US 321) in Sycamore. In 1942, its alignment was straightened, leaving Rivers Bridge Road (S-5-31/S-15-37). By 1948, SC 641 was extended west to Allendale, replacing part of SC 73. In 1952, it was extended west again to the southern boundary of the Savannah River Plant, replacing part of SC 28; reaching its apex of over 44 miles (71 km) long. Between 1968 and 1970, SC 641 was truncated at US 301, its former route replaced by SC 125.

== Junction list ==
County	Location	mi	km	Destinations	Notes
Allendale		0.000	0.000	US 301 (Burton's Ferry Highway) – Allendale, Bamberg, Orangeburg	Western terminus
Allendale	Sycamore	4.330	6.968	US 321 (Buford's Bridge Highway) – Fairfax, Ulmer, Columbia	
Bamberg	No major junctions				
Colleton		15.530	24.993	US 601 (Broxton Bridge Highway) – Hampton, Bamberg	
Colleton		21.560	34.697	SC 64 (Lodge Highway) – Lodge, Walterboro	Eastern terminus
1.000 mi = 1.609 km; 1.000 km = 0.621 mi
