= South Carolina Highway 73 (disambiguation) =

South Carolina Highway 73 may refer to:

- South Carolina Highway 73 (1920s): a former state highway from Fort Mill to Indian Land
- South Carolina Highway 73 (1930s): a former state highway from Brownsville to Dillon
- South Carolina Highway 73 (1939–1942): a former state highway from Latta to near Fork
- South Carolina Highway 73 (1940s): a former state highway from southwest of Allendale to Sycamore
- South Carolina Highway 73: a former state highway from Springmaid Beach to Myrtle Beach
