= Gravel Hill Plantation (Allendale, South Carolina) =

Historic house in South Carolina, United States

- U.S. National Register of Historic Places
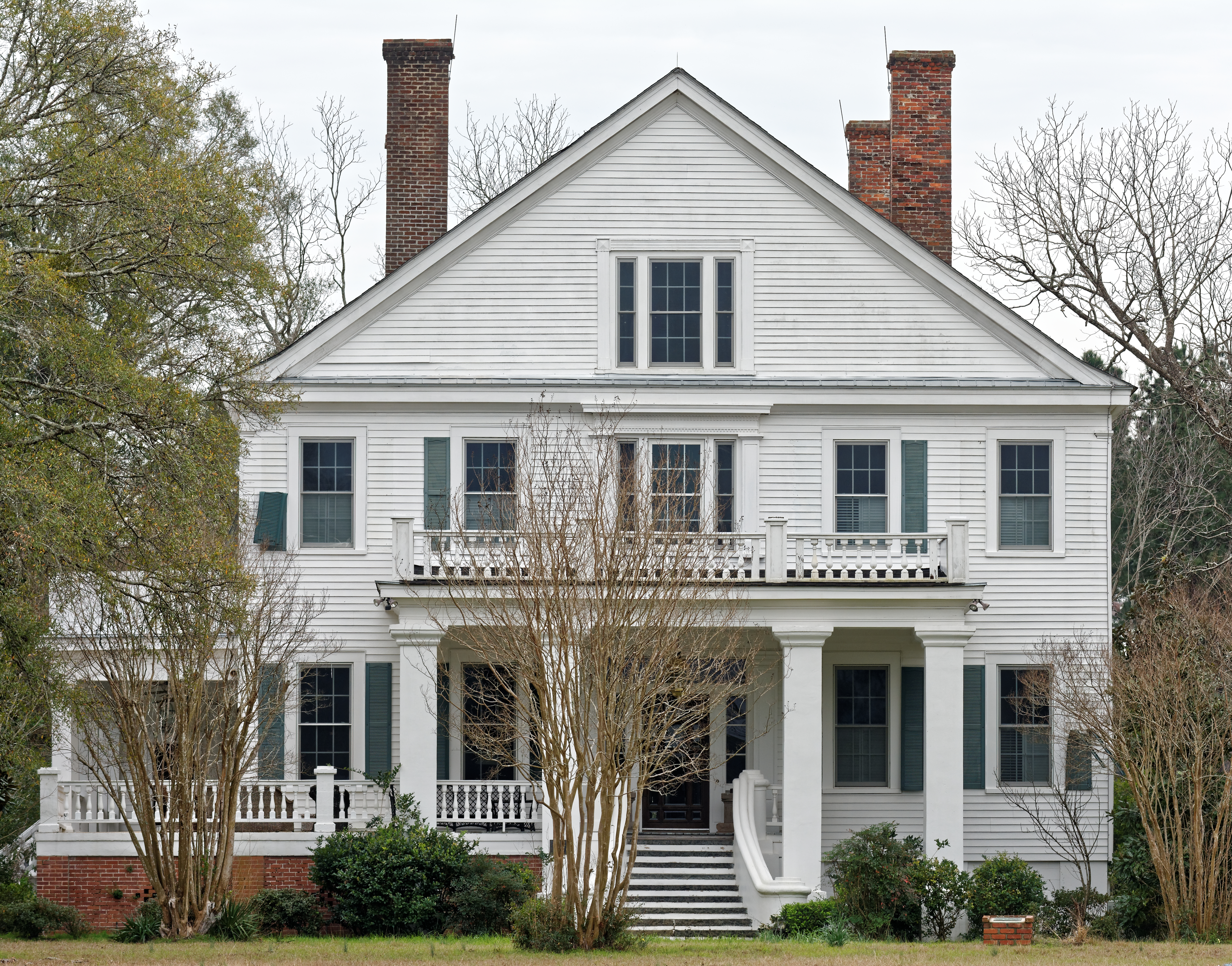
- The house in 2017

- Location within South Carolina Location within the United States
- Location: State Secondary Highway 342; Off U.S. Highway 301; Allendale, South Carolina
- Coordinates: 32.96669°N 81.38593°W
- Area: 7 acres (2.8 ha)
- Built: 1857-1859
- Built by: Willingham, Benjamin
- Architectural style: Greek Revival
- NRHP reference No.: 76001688
- Added to NRHP: May 28, 1976

Gravel Hill Plantation is a historic plantation house located near Allendale, Allendale County, South Carolina. It was built between 1857 and 1859, and is a two-story white frame Greek Revival style dwelling with two small wings on a raised basement. It has a gable roof and a one-story portico supported by four wooden square columns. It also has a balustraded piazza with five small columns on the east façade. Also on the property is a contributing two-story frame smokehouse. Gravel Hill Plantation at one time had nearly 1000 acres of land and fronted Gravel Hill (Bryan) road, Ashe road, and Community road (known today as Gaul Branch road.) Also for many years, Gravel Hill was owned by the Bryan Brothers and the family operated a school on the property named Bull Pond School. The school was also used as a voting place. Notable neighbors of Gravel Hill were Erwinton Plantation to the west which exists today and is located on River road and also Bull Pond Plantation which was owned by the Flowers and Brown families and was located to the south across Community road (Gaul Branch RD) from Gravel Hill.

It was added to the National Register of Historic Places in 1976.

== See also ==
- National Register of Historic Places listings in Allendale County, South Carolina
