= Smyrna Baptist Church =

Historic church in South Carolina, United States

- U.S. National Register of Historic Places
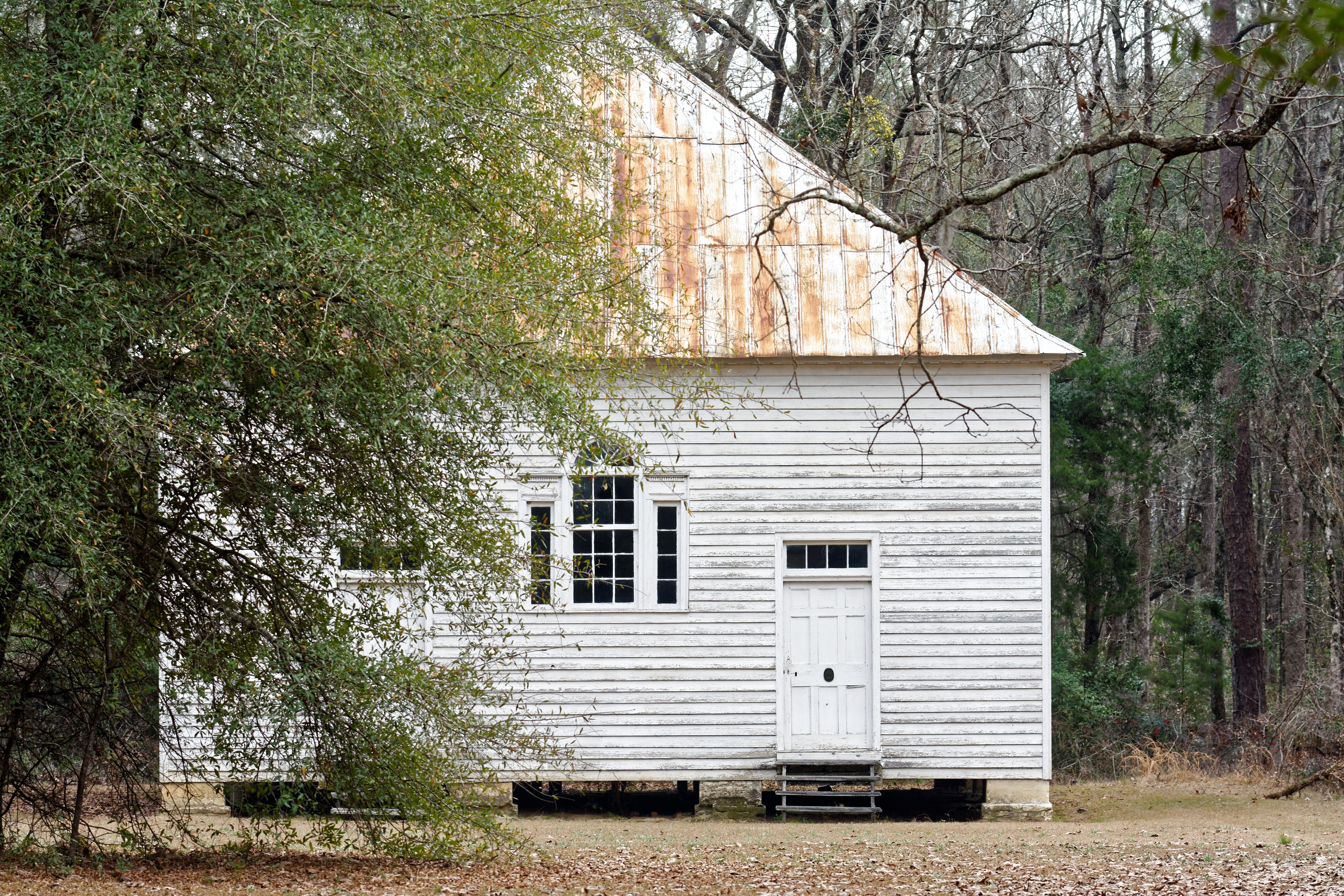
- The church in 2017

- Location within South Carolina Location within the United States
- Location: South of Allendale on South Carolina Highway 22, near Allendale, South Carolina
- Coordinates: 32.93652°N 81.35181°W
- Area: 7 acres (2.8 ha)
- Built: 1827
- Architectural style: Meeting House Design
- NRHP reference No.: 76001691
- Added to NRHP: May 28, 1976

Smyrna Baptist Church, also known as Kirkland Church, is a historic Baptist church located near Allendale, Allendale County, South Carolina. It was built in 1827, and is a one-story, meeting house style frame structure with a hipped roof. The front facade features a central Palladian window flanked by balancing nine-paneled entrance doors. A cemetery surrounds the church.

Dr. William Erwin, the original owner of Erwinton, his wife and sister-in-law were all excommunicated from Kirkland Church in 1833 for their affiliation with other denominations. They then formed the second Christian congregation, the Disciples of Christ, in South Carolina. They held weekly meetings at Erwinton until 1835 when the present meeting house was completed and dedicated as Antioch Christian Church.

It was added to the National Register of Historic Places in 1976.

The land the church resides on belonged to the Mixson family and was deeded to the church by William J. Mixson on June 5, 1849 with the condition, "the said lot of Land is to used, held and enjoyed by now but the Baptist denomination of the same faith and order as those now worshiping there."

== See also ==
- National Register of Historic Places listings in Allendale County, South Carolina
