= Antioch Christian Church (Allendale, South Carolina) =

Historic church in South Carolina, United States

- U.S. National Register of Historic Places
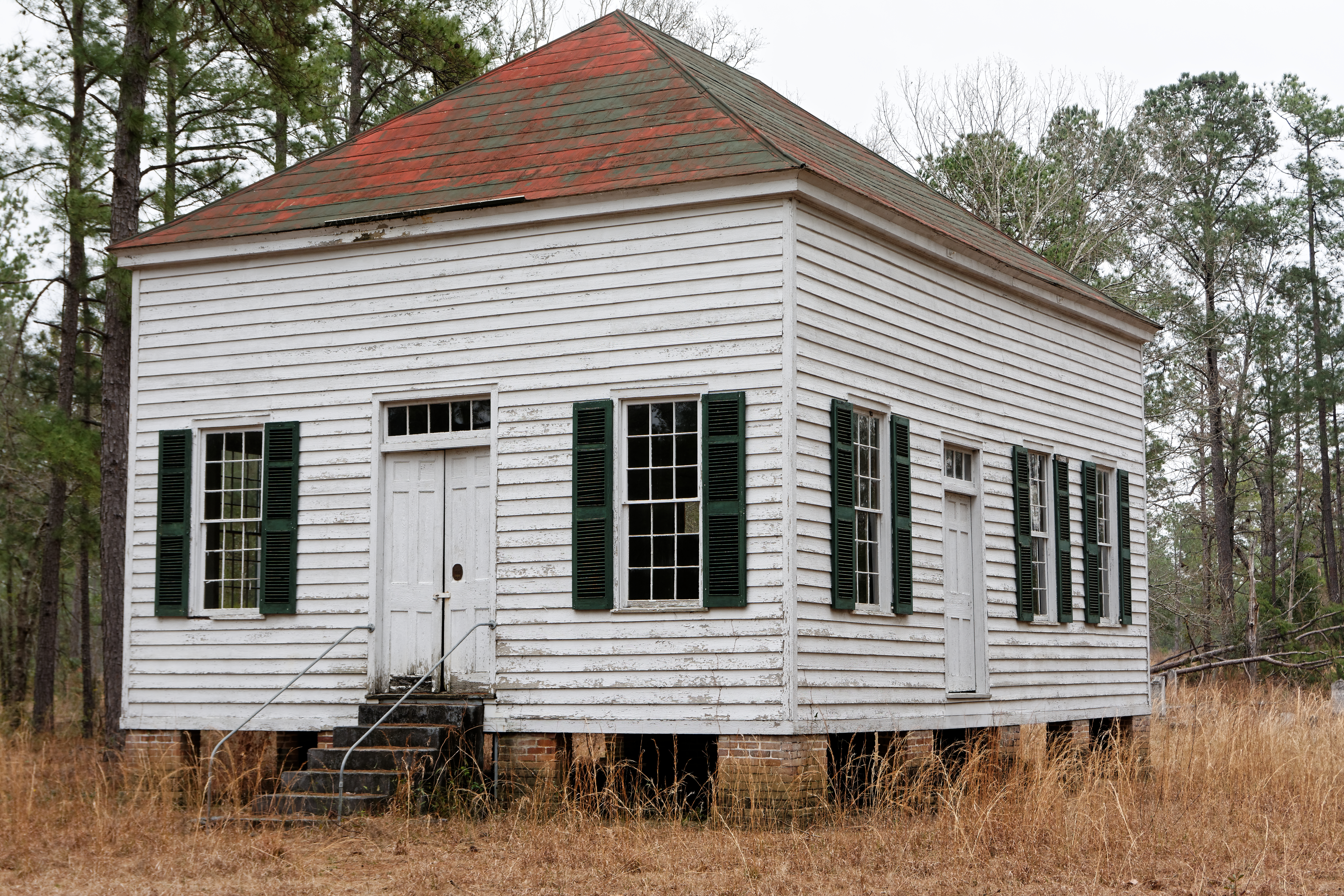
- The church in 2019

- Location within South Carolina Location within the United States
- Location: Southwest of Allendale on South Carolina Highway 3, near Allendale, South Carolina
- Coordinates: 32.94778°N 81.41493°W
- Area: 4 acres (1.6 ha)
- Built: c. 1835
- Architectural style: Meeting House Style
- NRHP reference No.: 77001212
- Added to NRHP: December 12, 1977

Antioch Christian Church is a historic Disciples of Christ church located near Allendale, Allendale County, South Carolina. It was built about 1835, and is a one-story, meeting house style clapboard structure with a hipped roof. The church was renovated in 1976. A cemetery, where many of Allendale's oldest families are buried, is located within the church's grounds. Founded in 1833, this church was the second Disciples of Christ congregation established in South Carolina. Its circa-1835 building is recognized as the state's oldest existing church structure of that denomination, earning it the designation "Mother Church".

Dr. William Erwin, the original owner of Erwinton, his wife and sister-in-law were all excommunicated from Kirkland Church (now Smyrna Baptist Church) in 1833 for their affiliation with other denominations. They then formed the second Christian congregation, the Disciples of Christ, in South Carolina. They held weekly meetings at Erwinton until 1835 when Antioch Christian Church was completed and dedicated. Prior to the building's completion, the congregation held worship meetings at Dr. Erwin's home.

It was added to the National Register of Historic Places in 1977. While the church was renovated in 1976 by the South Carolina Disciples of Christ, the interior was not part of this renovation.

== See also ==
- National Register of Historic Places listings in Allendale County, South Carolina
