= Walter Lloyd =

Walter Lloyd may refer to:

- Walter Lloyd (1580–1661), member of parliament for Cardiganshire, 1640–1644
- Walter Lloyd (1678–1747), member of parliament for Cardiganshire, 1734–1742
- Walter P. Lloyd, member of the South Carolina House of Representatives
- Wally Lloyd, motorcycle speedway rider
- Walt Lloyd, a fictional character on the American television series Lost
