= DeLoach =

DeLoach is a surname. Notable people with the surname include:

- Bill DeLoach, American singer, keyboardist, guitarist, composer, vocal arranger, musical director, and music producer
- Darryl DeLoach, American singer
- Deke DeLoach, American deputy director of the Federal Bureau of Investigation
- Gary DeLoach, American football coach
- Heather DeLoach, American actress
- Janay DeLoach Soukup, American athlete
- Jay A. DeLoach, director of Naval History
- Jerry DeLoach, American football player
- Joe DeLoach, American sprinter
- Marva L. DeLoach, American librarian
- Nikki DeLoach, American actress
- Ralph DeLoach, American football player
- Shannon DeLoach, American politician
