= Senator McLeod =

Senator McLeod may refer to:

- Gloria Negrete McLeod (born 1941), California State Senate
- Peden B. McLeod (1940–2021), South Carolina State Senate
- Thomas Gordon McLeod (1868–1932), South Carolina State Senate
