= Erwin House (Allendale, South Carolina) =

Historic house in South Carolina, United States

- U.S. National Register of Historic Places
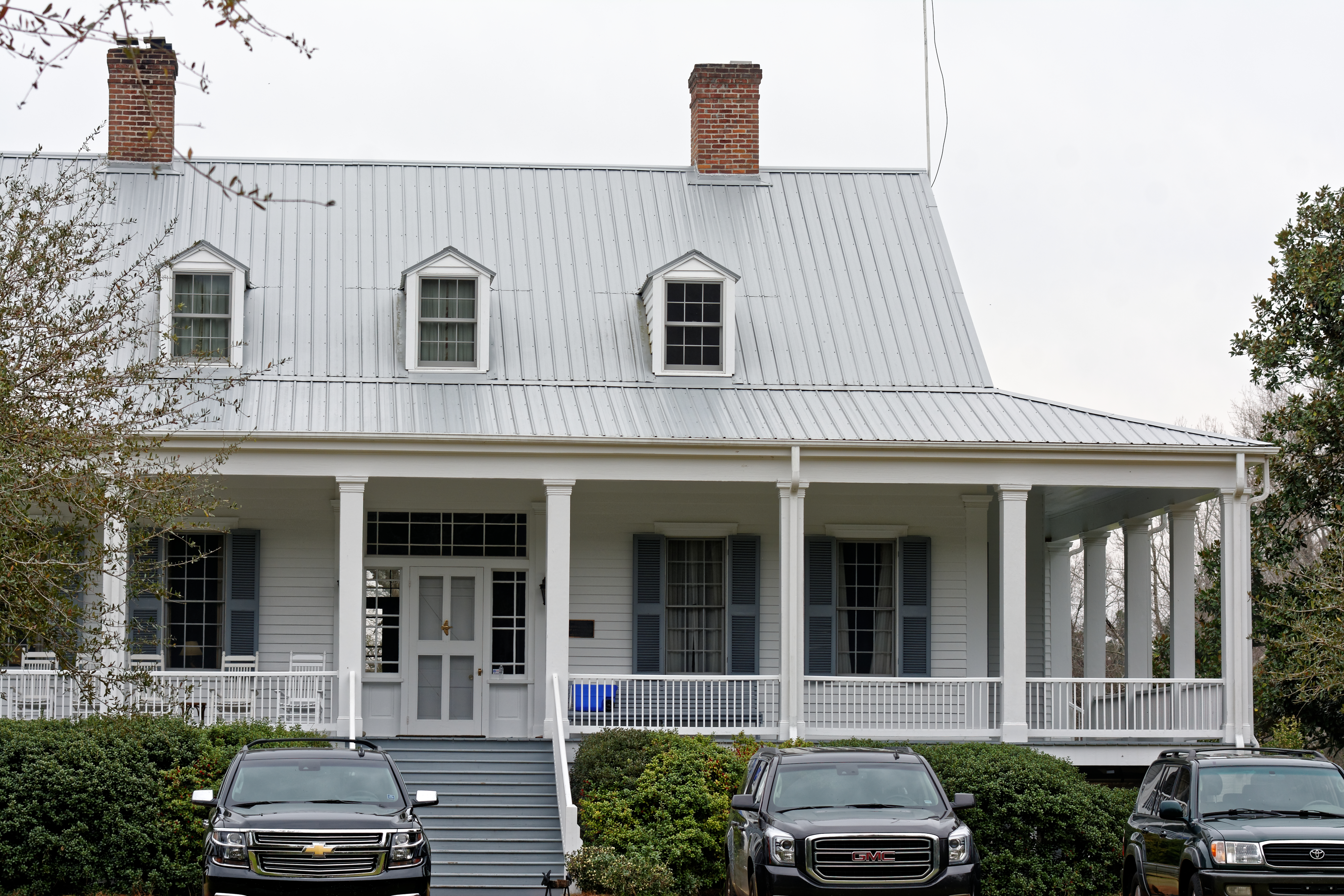
- The Erwin House in 2017

- Location within South Carolina Location within the United States
- Location: Southwest of Allendale off U.S. Route 301, near Allendale, South Carolina
- Coordinates: 32.95701°N 81.41567°W
- Area: 5 acres (2.0 ha)
- Built: c. 1828
- Built by: Erwin, DR. W.R.
- Architectural style: Bahamian
- NRHP reference No.: 76001687
- Added to NRHP: May 7, 1976

Erwin House, also known as Erwinton Plantation and Hunting Club, is a historic home located near Allendale, Allendale County, South Carolina, United States. It was built around 1828, and is a 1 1/2-story, white clapboard dwelling on a raised brick basement. The front façade features three dormers and a full-width piazza with 14 square wooden columns, that also extends halfway down each of the side facades. Dr. William Erwin, the original owner of Erwinton, his wife and sister-in-law were all excommunicated from Kirkland Church in 1833 for their affiliation with other denominations. They then formed the second Christian congregation, the Disciples of Christ, in South Carolina. They held weekly meetings at Erwinton until 1835 when the present meeting house was completed and dedicated as Antioch Christian Church.

It was added to the National Register of Historic Places in 1976.

== See also ==
- National Register of Historic Places listings in Allendale County, South Carolina
