= Roselawn =

Roselawn may refer to:

in Northern Ireland

- Roselawn Cemetery

in Canada

- Roselawn National Historic Site of Canada, in Kingston, Ontario

in the United States

(by state)

- Roselawn (Altheimer, Arkansas), listed on the NRHP in Arkansas
- Roselawn (Cartersville, Georgia), listed on the NRHP in Georgia
- Roselawn, Indiana, a (CDP)
  - Also as a metonym for American Eagle Flight 4184, a 1994 plane crash near Roselawn, Indiana.
- Roselawn (Danville, Kentucky), listed on the NRHP in Kentucky
- Roselawn, Cincinnati, Ohio, a neighborhood
- Roselawn (Allendale, South Carolina), listed on the NRHP in South Carolina
- Rose Lawn, Wisconsin, an unincorporated community
