= Williams House (Ulmer, South Carolina) =

Historic house in South Carolina, United States

- U.S. National Register of Historic Places
- Location within South Carolina Location within the United States
- Location: US 321, near Ulmer, South Carolina
- Coordinates: 33.084913°N 81.207035°W
- Area: less than one acre
- Built: c. 1800
- Architectural style: Hall and parlor log house
- NRHP reference No.: 99000104
- Added to NRHP: February 17, 1999

Williams House, also known as the John Wilson Williams House, is a historic home located near Ulmer, Allendale County, South Carolina. The house consists of a residence built about 1800, with an addition built about 1906. It is a 1 1/2-story, three-bay, lateral gable-roofed, log and clapboard hall and parlor farmhouse. The main body of the house consists of two rooms measuring approximately 30 feet by 16 feet. The Williams Home Place has remained continually in the same family for more than 200 years.

It was added to the National Register of Historic Places in 1999.
