= Lawton Mounds =

Archaeological site in South Carolina, United States

- U.S. National Register of Historic Places
- Nearest city: Johnson's Landing, South Carolina
- Area: 3 acres (1.2 ha)
- NRHP reference No.: 72001185
- Added to NRHP: June 19, 1972

Lawton Mounds is a historic archaeological site located near Johnson's Landing, Allendale County, South Carolina. The site consists of two low earthen flat-topped mounds and surrounding village area, enclosed by a ditch and parapet. The North Mound is essentially rectangular, 65 feet by 70 feet at the base, standing 5 feet above the terrace. The South Mound is 100 feet distant from the first, also rectangular, 70 feet by 85 feet at the base and 7 feet, 6 inches high.

It was added to the National Register of Historic Places in 1972.
