= Roselawn (Allendale, South Carolina) =

Historic house in South Carolina, United States

- U.S. National Register of Historic Places
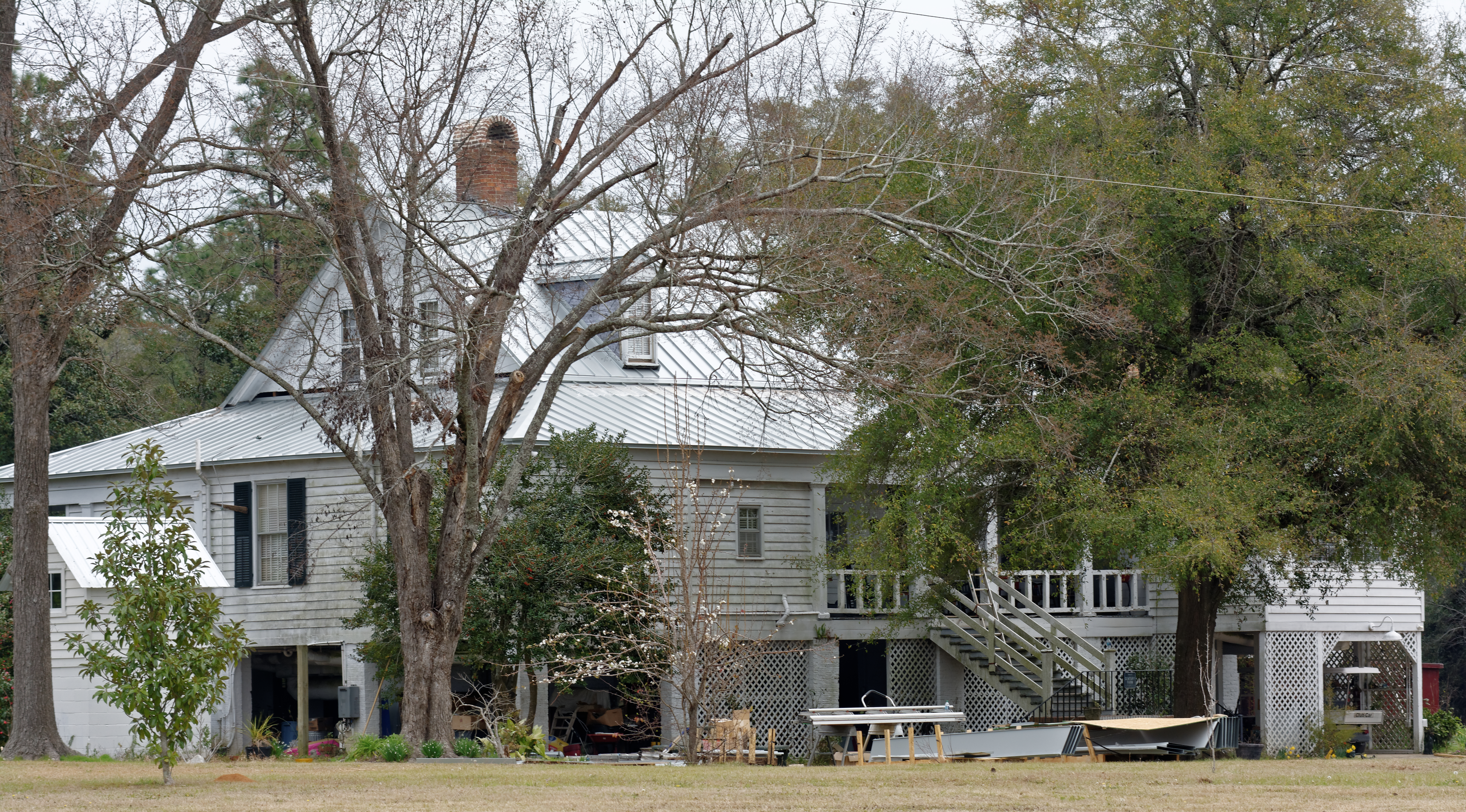
- Roselawn in 2017

- Location within South Carolina Location within the United States
- Location: 3 miles southwest of Allendale on South Carolina Highway 47, near Allendale, South Carolina
- Coordinates: 32.98297°N 81.34625°W
- Area: 3 acres (1.2 ha)
- Built: 1835-1840
- Built by: Lawton, Joseph Alexander
- Architectural style: Raised Cottage Style
- NRHP reference No.: 76001689
- Added to NRHP: May 28, 1976

Roselawn, also known as Lawton House, is a historic house located near Allendale, Allendale County, South Carolina. It was built between about 1835 and 1840 by Joseph Lawton, a local minister and brother to Benjamin Lawton, signer of the South Carolina Ordinance of Succession. Roselawn is a 1 1/2-story, raised cottage-style clapboard dwelling with a broken gable roof. The front façade features three dormer windows and a full-width piazza. Lawton family tradition holds that Union General Hugh Judson Kilpatrick camped at Roselawn while in the area. Roselawn has remained in the Lawton family throughout its entire history.

It was added to the National Register of Historic Places in 1976.

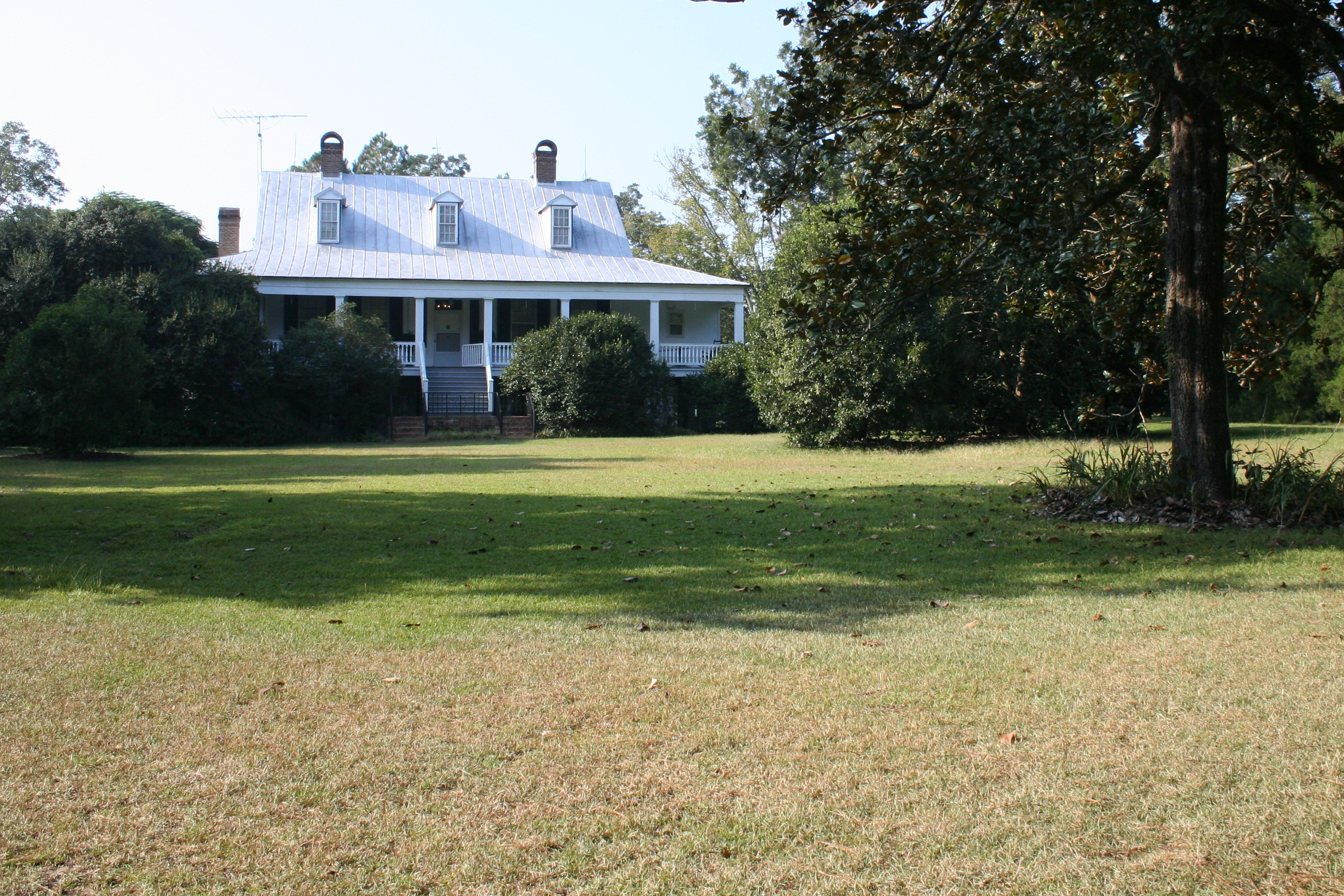

== See also ==
- National Register of Historic Places listings in Allendale County, South Carolina
