= Fennell Hill =

Archaeological site in South Carolina, United States

- U.S. National Register of Historic Places
- Nearest city: Peeples, South Carolina
- Area: 5 acres (2.0 ha)
- NRHP reference No.: 74001820
- Added to NRHP: November 19, 1974

Fennell Hill, also known as Cox Site and Milberry Site, is a historic archaeological site located near Peeples, Allendale County, South Carolina. It is a formative shell midden on the Savannah River measuring about 96 meters long by about 48 meters in width. The midden contains large quantities of fiber-tempered and Thom's Creek pottery—both examples of the earliest pottery found in the southeast.

It was added to the National Register of Historic Places in 1974.
