= Martin, South Carolina =

Martin
- Unincorporated community
- Location within the state of South Carolina
- Coordinates: 33°04′09″N 81°28′35″W
- Country: United States
- State: South Carolina
- County: Allendale
- Elevation: 92 ft (28 m)
- Time zone: UTC-5 (Eastern (EST))
  - Summer (DST): UTC-4 (EDT)
- ZIP codes: 29836
- GNIS feature ID: 1227943

Martin is an unincorporated community in northwestern Allendale County, South Carolina, United States. It lies along SC 125 northwest of the town of Allendale, the county seat of Allendale County. Its elevation is 92 feet (28 m). Although Martin is unincorporated, it has a post office, with the ZIP code of 29836.

== History ==
The Allendale Chert Quarries Archeological District was added to the National Register of Historic Places in 1985.
