= Michael F. Rivers Sr. =

American politician

Member of the South Carolina House of Representatives from the 121st district
- Incumbent
- Assumed office November 14, 2016
- Preceded by: Kenneth Hodges
- Succeeded by: Shannon DeLoach (elect)

Personal details
- Born: October 16, 1958 (age 68) Baltimore, Maryland, United States
- Party: Democratic
- Education: Claflin University (B.S.)

Michael F. Rivers Sr. is an American politician. He is a member of the South Carolina House of Representatives from the 121st District, serving since 2016. He is a member of the Democratic party. Rivers served on the Beaufort County School Board from 1998 to 2016.

Rivers serves as Chaplain of the South Carolina Legislative Black Caucus.
