= Red Bluff Flint Quarries =

Archaeological site in South Carolina, United States

- U.S. National Register of Historic Places
- Nearest city: Allendale, South Carolina
- Area: 46 acres (19 ha)
- NRHP reference No.: 72001184
- Added to NRHP: June 22, 1972

Red Bluff Flint Quarries is a historic archaeological site located near Allendale, Allendale County, South Carolina. The site consist of two outcrops of marine chert or flint, which were heavily used by Native Americans in prehistoric times as sources of tool raw materials.

It was added to the National Register of Historic Places in 1972.

== See also ==
- National Register of Historic Places listings in Allendale County, South Carolina
