= Colding-Walker House =

Historic house in South Carolina, United States

- U.S. National Register of Historic Places
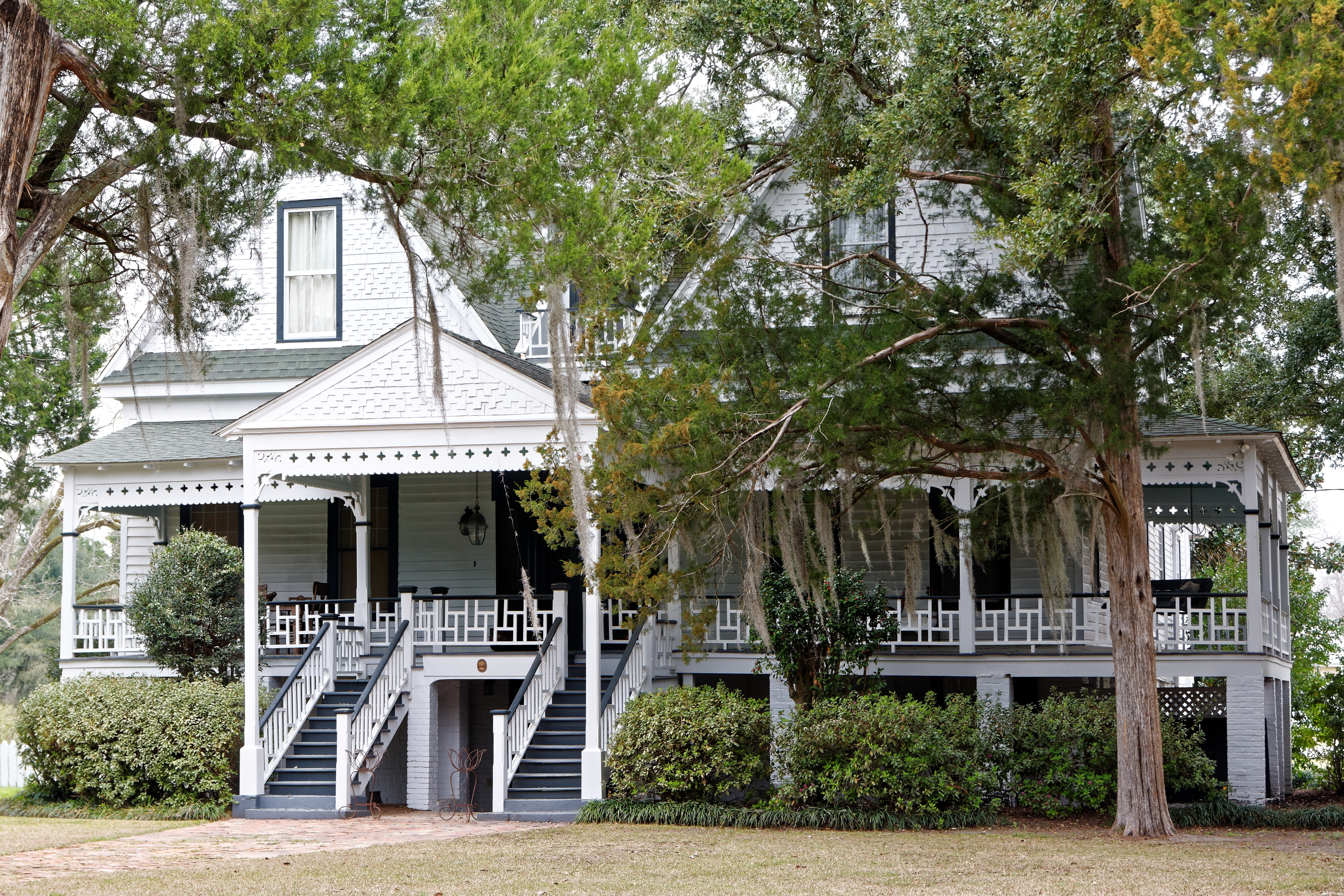
- The house in 2017

- Location within South Carolina Location within the United States
- Location: SC 52, Appleton, South Carolina
- Coordinates: 33.04164°N 81.36545°W
- Area: 5 acres (2.0 ha)
- Built: c. 1853, 1897
- Built by: Colding, C.H.
- Architectural style: Late Victorian, Mid 19th Century Revival, Low country massed plan
- NRHP reference No.: 98000415
- Added to NRHP: April 30, 1998

Colding-Walker House, also known as Robwood, is a historic home located at Appleton, Allendale County, South Carolina. The original section was built about 1853, and is a 1 1/2-story side gable roofed residence on a raised brick basement. It was extensively renovated in the late 1890s. The front façade features a full-width wrap-around porch and gable front portico embellished with Folk Victorian style spindlework detailing. Also located on the property are a carriage house, smokehouse, and barn.

It was added to the National Register of Historic Places in 1998.
