= Allendale County Courthouse =

- U.S. National Register of Historic Places
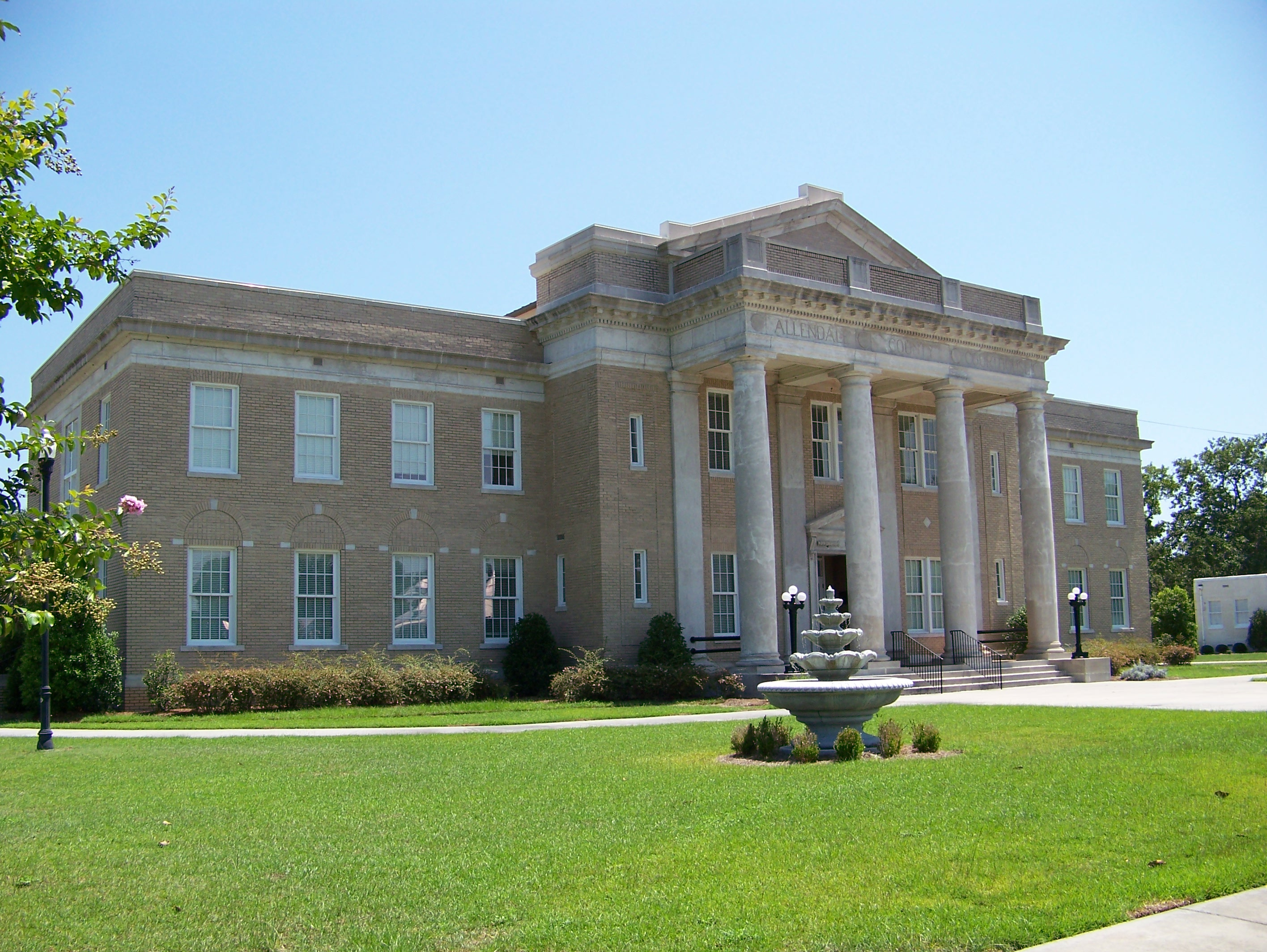

- Location within South Carolina Location within the United States
- Location: 292 Barnwell Hwy., Allendale, South Carolina
- Coordinates: 33°0′46″N 81°18′22″W
- Area: less than one acre
- Built: 1921-1922
- Built by: A. J. Krebs & Company
- Architect: G. Lloyd Preacher & Company
- Architectural style: Classical Revival
- NRHP reference No.: 06000580
- Added to NRHP: August 1, 2007

Allendale County Courthouse is a historic county courthouse in Allendale, Allendale County, South Carolina. It was added to the National Register of Historic Places in 2007.

== Description and history ==
It was built in 1921–1922, and is a two-story yellow brick and limestone-accented building with a central block with pedestaled pediment dominated by a monumental, unengaged, flat-roofed Neoclassical Revival portico. The portico features four massive limestone columns and responding pilasters of the Tuscan order, a classical entablature, and a brick-and-limestone parapet.

Immediately to the rear and connected to the historic courthouse by a narrow two-story hyphen is a large office and courtroom building that was completed and occupied in 2004. The interior was restored after a devastating arson fire on the morning of May 18, 1998.

== See also ==
- National Register of Historic Places listings in Allendale County, South Carolina
