= Kenneth Hodges =

American politician (1952–2025)

Member of the South Carolina House of Representatives from the 121st district
- In office 2005–2017
- Preceded by: Walter P. Lloyd
- Succeeded by: Michael F. Rivers Sr.

Personal details
- Born: February 11, 1952 Bennetts Point, South Carolina, U.S.
- Died: April 22, 2025 (aged 73) Beaufort, South Carolina, U.S.
- Party: Democratic

Kenneth Hodges (February 11, 1952 – April 22, 2025) was an American politician and Baptist minister. He was a member of the South Carolina House of Representatives from the 121st District, serving from 2005 until 2017. He was a member of the Democratic Party.

Hodges grew up in Colleton County, South Carolina, and attended Clark Atlanta University as an undergraduate and Morehouse College, where he earned a Master of Divinity. He was the longtime pastor of Tabernacle Baptist Church in Beaufort, South Carolina. He also served in the South Carolina House of Representatives for over a decade. In 2015, he ran in a special election to the South Carolina Senate, to succeed his friend, fellow pastor Clementa C. Pinckney, who was killed in the Charleston church shooting; however, he did not win the Democratic primary.

Hodges also owned an art gallery in Beaufort.

Hodges died at Beaufort Memorial Hospital on April 22, 2025, at the age of 73. Governor Henry McMaster ordered that flags in the state be flown half-staff on Sunday, May 3, 2025 to honor his service.

Among funeral attendees: Beaufort Mayor Phil Cromer, former state legislator and former Beaufort Mayor Billy Keyserling, Pastor and National Action Network leader Rev. Nelson B. Rivers III, County Councilman York Glover and state Representative Michael F. Rivers Sr., of St. Helena Island.
