= Allendale Chert Quarries Archeological District =

Archaeological site in South Carolina, United States

- U.S. National Register of Historic Places
- U.S. Historic district
- Nearest city: Martin, South Carolina
- Area: 1,550 acres (630 ha)
- NRHP reference No.: 85002699
- Added to NRHP: September 28, 1985

Allendale Chert Quarries Archeological District is a set of 14 prehistoric archaeological sites located near Martin, Allendale County, South Carolina. The district includes the quarries and sites related to the processing of chert located on the bank of the Savannah River at distances of up to 1 1/2 miles away from the river.

It was added to the National Register of Historic Places in 1985.
