= Sycamore, South Carolina =

Sycamore
- Town
- Location within South Carolina Location within the United States
- Coordinates: 33°02′10″N 81°13′20″W
- Country: United States
- State: South Carolina
- County: Allendale

Area
  - Total: 3.18 sq mi (8.24 km^{2})
  - Land: 3.17 sq mi (8.21 km^{2})
  - Water: 0.0077 sq mi (0.02 km^{2})
- Elevation: 151 ft (46 m)

Population (2020)
  - Total: 147
  - Density: 46/sq mi (17.9/km^{2})
- Time zone: UTC-5 (Eastern (EST))
  - Summer (DST): UTC-4 (EDT)
- ZIP code: 29846
- Area codes: 803, 839
- FIPS code: 45-70900
- GNIS feature ID: 2406704

Sycamore is a town in Allendale County, South Carolina, United States. As of the 2020 census, Sycamore had a population of 147. On April 5, 2022, the town was hit by an EF3 tornado, although it had weakened to EF1 strength by the time it moved through town and only minor damage occurred. One person was injured by this tornado south of Allendale, South Carolina.

== Geography ==
According to the United States Census Bureau, the town has a total area of 3.2 square miles (8.2 km^{2}), of which 0.008 square miles (0.02 km^{2}), or 0.29%, is water.

== Demographics ==
Historical population
Census	Pop.	Note	%±
1900	79		—
1910	99		25.3%
1920	118		19.2%
1930	149		26.3%
1940	324		117.4%
1950	383		18.2%
1960	401		4.7%
1970	229		−42.9%
1980	261		14.0%
1990	208		−20.3%
2000	185		−11.1%
2010	180		−2.7%
2020	147		−18.3%
U.S. Decennial Census

=== 2020 census ===
Sycamore racial composition (Hispanics excluded from racial categories) (NH = Non-Hispanic)
Race	Number	Percentage
White (NH)	95	64.63%
Black or African American (NH)	40	27.21%
Native American or Alaska Native (NH)	4	2.72%
Mixed/Multi-Racial (NH)	5	3.4%
Hispanic or Latino	3	2.04%
Total	147	

As of the 2020 United States census, there were 147 people, 104 households, and 36 families residing in the town.

=== 2000 census ===
At the 2000 census there were 185 people, 81 households, and 54 families living in the town. The population density was 58.3 inhabitants per square mile (22.5/km^{2}). There were 93 housing units at an average density of 29.3 per square mile (11.3/km^{2}). The racial makeup of the town was 61.62% White, 35.14% African American, 0.54% Native American, 0.54% from other races, and 2.16% from two or more races. Hispanic or Latino of any race were 2.16%.

Of the 81 households 22.2% had children under the age of 18 living with them, 48.1% were married couples living together, 13.6% had a female householder with no husband present, and 33.3% were non-families. 29.6% of households were one person and 16.0% were one person aged 65 or older. The average household size was 2.28 and the average family size was 2.85.

The age distribution was 18.9% under the age of 18, 8.1% from 18 to 24, 25.9% from 25 to 44, 25.4% from 45 to 64, and 21.6% 65 or older. The median age was 43 years. For every 100 females, there were 94.7 males. For every 100 females age 18 and over, there were 82.9 males.

The median household income was $28,333 and the median family income was $40,625. Males had a median income of $35,500 versus $18,750 for females. The per capita income for the town was $18,297. About 6.8% of families and 10.1% of the population were below the poverty line, including 7.5% of those under the age of eighteen and 16.7% of those sixty five or over.
