= Port of Tampico =

Tampico
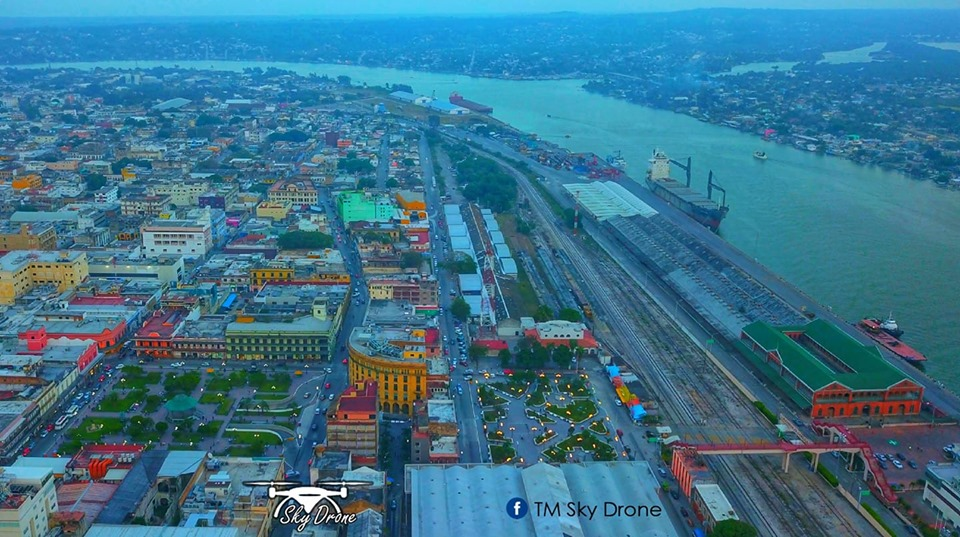
- Interactive map of Tampico
- Location within Mexico

Location
- Country: Mexico
- Location: Tampico, Tamaulipas
- Coordinates: 22°16′N 97°46′W
- UN/LOCODE: MXTAM

Details
- No. of berths: 34
- Draft depth: 9.34 metres (30.6 ft)

Statistics
- Website puertodetampico.com.mx

The Port of Tampico is a port facility located on Mexico’s Gulf coast, on the northwest side of the Bay of Campeche. It is located in Tampico, Tamaulipas.

A leading port for the offshore industry, Tampico handles most cargo types.
