= Shannon DeLoach =

American politician

Member-elect of the South Carolina House of Representatives from the 121st district
- Assuming office November 9, 2026
- Succeeding: Michael F. Rivers Sr.

Personal details
- Party: Democratic
- Website: Campaign website

Shannon N. DeLoach is an American politician. A member of the Democratic Party, he is the member for the 121st district of the South Carolina House of Representatives. He was elected at the 2026 election.
