= James P. Harrelson =

American politician (1919–2003)

Member of the South Carolina House of Representatives from the 121st district
- In office 1991–1994
- Preceded by: Jackson V. Gregory
- Succeeded by: Walter P. Lloyd

Personal details
- Born: June 28, 1919 Green Pond, South Carolina, U.S.
- Died: April 30, 2003 (aged 83)
- Profession: Pastor, attorney

James Pershing 'Preacher' Harrelson (June 28, 1919 - April 30, 2003) was an American politician, pastor and attorney.

== Early life, education and career ==
Harrelson graduated from Southwestern Baptist Theological Seminary in Fort Worth, Texas and was ordained at the First Baptist Church of Hendersonville, North Carolina. He ministered in Florence County, South Carolina, before moving to Walterboro in the late 1940s, serving Cottageville Baptist Church, Black Creek Baptist Church, Pleasant Grove Baptist Church at Canadys and Bethlehem Baptist Church at Round O. Harrelson was admitted to the Bar on June 11, 1952. He served on the board of trustees of the Baptist General Board of South Carolina from 1948 to 1953. He established his law practice in Walterboro and remained there until his semi-retirement in the late 1990s.

== Political life ==
=== South Carolina House of Representatives ===
Harrelson was a member of the South Carolina House of Representatives from the 121st District, serving from 1991 until 1994.

=== South Carolina Senate ===
Harrelson was a member of the South Carolina Senate from the 15th District from 1963 until 1976 when he lost in a runoff with William Tindall Howell.

Harrelson served as chair of the Colleton County Democratic Party, and was National Committeeman of the Young Democrats of South Carolina from 1952 to 1957.

== Personal life ==
Harrelson was married to Hazel Richardson. They had two children.

== Honors and recognitions ==
Harrelson was a recipient of the Order of the Palmetto.
