= Walter P. Lloyd =

American politician and educator

Member of the South Carolina House of Representatives from the 121st district
- In office 1995–2004
- Preceded by: James P. Harrelson
- Succeeded by: Kenneth Hodges

Personal details
- Born: Eastover, South Carolina, U.S.
- Died: April 14, 2005
- Profession: Educator

Walter P. Lloyd was an American politician and educator. He was a member of the South Carolina House of Representatives from the 121st District, serving from 1995 until 2004.

== Early life, education and career ==
Lloyd graduated from South Carolina State University in 1957, later receiving an M.Ed., in 1963. Prior to that he served in the US Military from 1952 to 1953. Lloyd taught agriculture at Ruffin High School from 1957 to 1975, and was an agriculture consultant to the State Department of Education from 1975 to 1992.

== Personal life ==
Lloyd married Yvonne Jackson in 1960. They had two daughters.

Lloyd died in 2005. A statement of condolence was published by Congressman Jim Clyburn. Further condolences came from State Education Superintendent Inez Tenenbaum, State Democratic Party Chair Joe Erwin, House Speaker David H. Wilkins, Rep. R. Thayer Rivers Jr., and House Minority Leader Harry L. Ott Jr.

== Honors and recognitions ==
The State legislature recognized Lloyd in a resolution, and named Exit 57 on Interstate 95 in Colleton County the "State Representative Walter P. Lloyd Memorial Interchange.
