= William Tindall Howell =

American politician (born 1941)

Member of the South Carolina Senate from the 15th district
- In office 1976–1979
- Preceded by: James P. Harrelson
- Succeeded by: Peden B. McLeod

Member of the South Carolina Senate

Personal details
- Born: March 8, 1941 (age 85) Colleton County, South Carolina

William Tindall Howell (born March 8, 1941) is an American politician, attorney and judge.

== Early life and education ==
Howell graduated in 1964 from Clemson University with an animal husbandry degree. Howell graduated from the University of South Carolina School of Law in 1967.

== Political career ==
In 1976, Howell was elected to the South Carolina Senate to represent the 15th District. He won the seat in a runoff, defeating incumbent James P. Harrelson.

== Legal career ==
In 1979, Howell left the legislature after his election by the state legislature to sit as a circuit judge at large, with statewide jurisdiction. In 1992, the General Assembly elected Howell as Chief Judge of the Court of Appeals, and he served until his retirement in 2000. Howell was then appointed chief mediator for the United States Court of Appeals for the Fourth Circuit, hearing appeals from the nine federal district courts in Maryland, Virginia, West Virginia, North Carolina and South Carolina, and from federal administrative agencies. Howell retired from this post in 2011.

== Personal life ==
Howell married Susan Dooley in 1964. They have three children, including a son who died in 2021 from cancer.

== Legacy ==
The William T. Howell Pre-Law Society at Clemson University was named in honor of Howell.

The William T. Howell Scholarship was created in March 2000 by the Colleton County Bar Association to honor Howell.
