= Appleton, South Carolina =

Settlement in South Carolina, United States

Appleton
- Unincorporated community
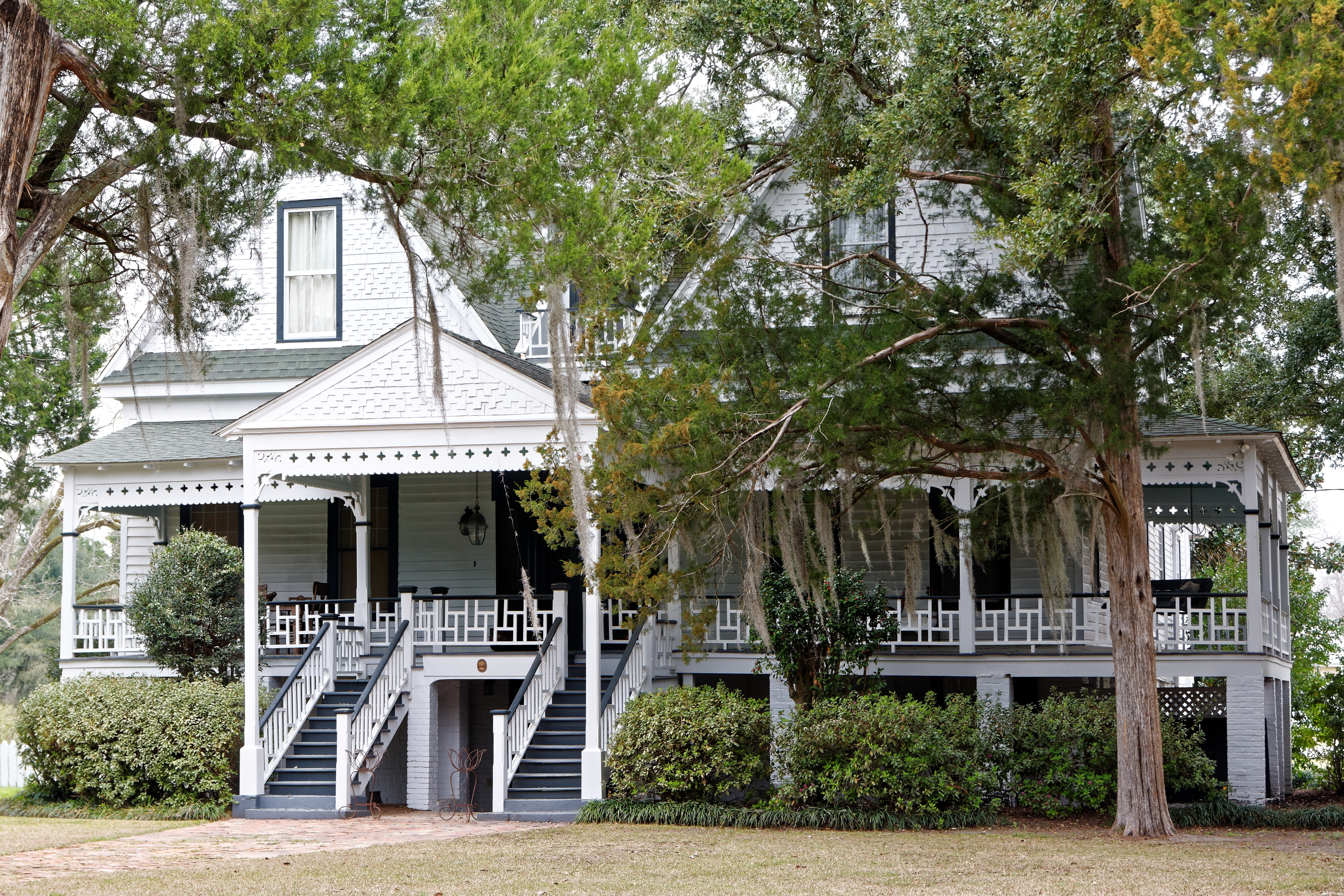
- Colding-Walker House

- Location within the state of South Carolina
- Coordinates: 33°02′37″N 81°21′46″W
- Country: United States
- State: South Carolina
- County: Allendale
- Elevation: 256 ft (78 m)
- Time zone: UTC-5 (Eastern (EST))
  - Summer (DST): UTC-4 (EDT)
- ZIP codes: 29810
- GNIS feature ID: 1231008

Appleton is an unincorporated community in Allendale County, in the U.S. state of South Carolina.

== History ==
Appleton was founded in 1872 when the railroad was extended to that point, and was named after a railroad agent. A post office called Appleton was established in 1872, and remained in operation until 1960.

In 1925, Appleton had 234 inhabitants.
