= Ulmer, South Carolina =

Ulmer
- Town
- Location within South Carolina Location within the United States Location within North America
- Coordinates: 33°05′55″N 81°12′29″W
- Country: United States
- State: South Carolina
- County: Allendale

Area
  - Total: 2.75 sq mi (7.13 km^{2})
  - Land: 2.74 sq mi (7.09 km^{2})
  - Water: 0.012 sq mi (0.03 km^{2})
- Elevation: 171 ft (52 m)

Population (2020)
  - Total: 65
  - Density: 23.7/sq mi (9.16/km^{2})
- Time zone: UTC-5 (Eastern (EST))
  - Summer (DST): UTC-4 (EDT)
- ZIP code: 29849
- Area codes: 803, 839
- FIPS code: 45-72880
- GNIS feature ID: 2406774

Ulmer is a town in Allendale County, South Carolina, United States. The population was 65 at the 2020 census.

== History ==
The Williams House was added to the National Register of Historic Places in 1999.

== Geography ==
According to the United States Census Bureau, the town has a total area of 2.7 square miles (7.1 km^{2}), of which 0.012 square miles (0.03 km^{2}), or 0.48%, is water.

== Demographics ==
Historical population
Census	Pop.	Note	%±
1900	150		—
1910	190		26.7%
1920	186		−2.1%
1930	199		7.0%
1940	169		−15.1%
1950	139		−17.8%
1960	168		20.9%
1970	109		−35.1%
1980	91		−16.5%
1990	90		−1.1%
2000	102		13.3%
2010	88		−13.7%
2020	65		−26.1%
U.S. Decennial Census

=== 2020 census ===
Ulmer racial composition (Hispanics excluded from racial categories) (NH = Non-Hispanic)
Race	Number	Percentage
White (NH)	39	60.0%
Black or African American (NH)	23	35.38%
Mixed/Multi-Racial (NH)	2	3.08%
Hispanic or Latino	1	1.54%
Total	65	

As of the 2020 United States census, there were 65 people, 23 households, and 8 families residing in the town.

=== 2000 census ===
As of the census of 2000, there were 102 people, 40 households, and 27 families living in the town. The population density was 103.9 inhabitants per square mile (40.1/km^{2}). There were 54 housing units at an average density of 55.0 per square mile (21.2/km^{2}). The racial makeup of the town was 85.29% White, 11.76% African American, 1.96% Native American, and 0.98% from two or more races.

There were 40 households, out of which 32.5% had children under the age of 18 living with them, 60.0% were married couples living together, 2.5% had a female householder with no husband present, and 32.5% were non-families. 27.5% of all households were made up of individuals, and 17.5% had someone living alone who was 65 years of age or older. The average household size was 2.55 and the average family size was 3.22.

In the town, the population was spread out, with 31.4% under the age of 18, 2.9% from 18 to 24, 28.4% from 25 to 44, 21.6% from 45 to 64, and 15.7% who were 65 years of age or older. The median age was 38 years. For every 100 females, there were 96.2 males. For every 100 females age 18 and over, there were 94.4 males.

The median income for a household in the town was $33,750, and the median income for a family was $53,333. Males had a median income of $26,667 versus $26,750 for females. The per capita income for the town was $16,363. There were 11.5% of families and 11.5% of the population living below the poverty line, including no under eighteens and 41.7% of those over 64.
