= Peden B. McLeod =

American politician (1940–2021)

Peden Brown McLeod

Member of the South Carolina House of Representatives from the 121st district
- In office 1972–1980
- Preceded by: Gerald Clarence Smoak
- Succeeded by: McKinley Washington Jr.

Member of the South Carolina Senate from the 15th district
- In office 1980–1985
- Preceded by: William Tindall Howell
- Succeeded by: N/A

Member of the South Carolina Senate from the 45th district
- In office 1985–1990
- Preceded by: N/A
- Succeeded by: McKinley Washington

Personal details
- Born: September 3, 1940 (age 86) Walterboro, South Carolina, United States
- Died: December 30, 2021 Walterboro, South Carolina, United States
- Party: Democratic
- Spouse: Mary
- Children: 4
- Education: Wofford College
- Occupation: Lawyer

Peden Brown McLeod (September 3, 1940 – December 30, 2021) was an American politician.

== Early life, education and military career ==
McLeod was born in Walterboro, South Carolina serving as a lawyer there. McLeod graduated from the Asheville Academy in Asheville, North Carolina. He then graduated from Wofford College in 1962. McLeod served in the United States Army from 1962 to 1964 and was commissioned a captain. In 1967, McLeod graduated from the University of South Carolina School of Law.

== Political career ==
McLeod served on Walterboro City Council from 1970 to 1972. He was elected to the South Carolina House of Representatives, serving from 1972 to 1980. He then served in the South Carolina Senate from 1980 to 1990. McLeod was a member of the Democratic Party.

== Death ==
McLeod died at the Colleton Medical Center in Walterboro, South Carolina.

== Legacy ==
In 1998 McLeod was awarded the Order of the Palmetto by Governor David Beasley, and The Peden McLeod Library on the Salkehatchie campus of the University of South Carolina, was dedicated to him. A Colleton County bridge is also named in his honor.
