= Allendale, South Carolina =

Allendale
- Town
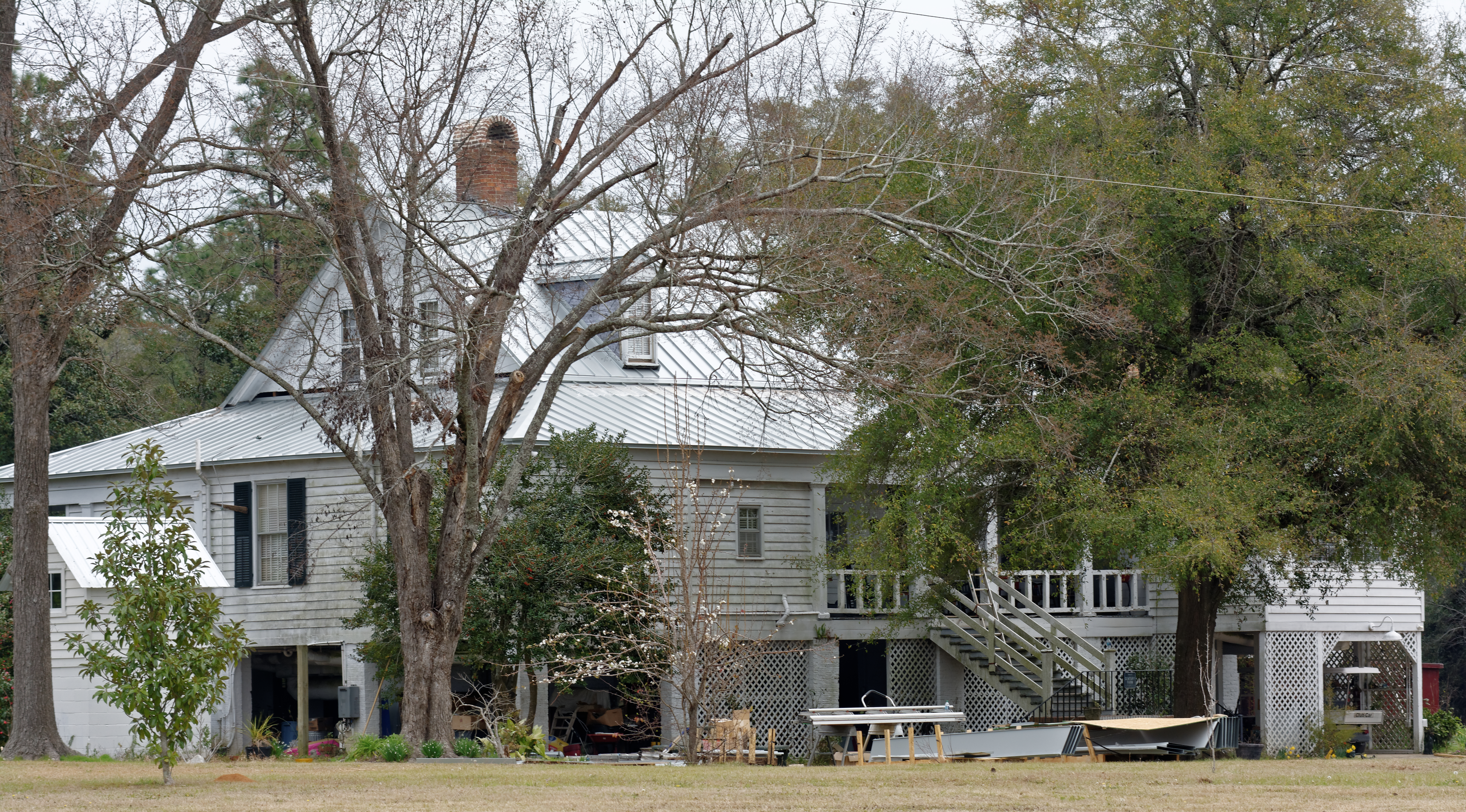
- Roselawn in 2017

- Seal

- Location within South Carolina Location within the United States Location within North America
- Coordinates: 33°00′16″N 81°18′32″W
- Country: United States
- State: South Carolina
- County: Allendale

Area
  - Total: 3.31 sq mi (8.57 km^{2})
  - Land: 3.31 sq mi (8.57 km^{2})
  - Water: 0 sq mi (0.00 km^{2})
- Elevation: 190 ft (58 m)

Population (2020)
  - Total: 2,694
  - Density: 813.9/sq mi (314.23/km^{2})
- Time zone: UTC-5 (Eastern (EST))
  - Summer (DST): UTC-4 (EDT)
- ZIP code: 29810
- Area codes: 803, 839
- FIPS code: 45-00955
- GNIS feature ID: 2405135
- Website: townofallendale.sc.gov

Allendale is a town in and the county seat of Allendale County, South Carolina, United States. The population was 3,482 at the 2010 census, a decline from 4,052 in 2000. The majority of residents are African American.

== History ==
Allendale has various historic properties including National Register of Historic Places listings in Allendale County, South Carolina. These include Allendale County Courthouse, Antioch Christian Church, Erwin House, Gravel Hill Plantation, Red Bluff Flint Quarries, Roselawn, and Smyrna Baptist Church are listed on the National Register of Historic Places.

The artist Jasper Johns lived in Allendale during his childhood in the 1930s and 1940s. He was raised there by his grandfather, a farmer, and then with his aunt, the only teacher in a two-room school.

In his 2015 book entitled Deep South: Four Seasons on Back Roads, author Paul Theroux describes Allendale as a "ghost town", "poor, neglected, hopeless-looking, a vivid failure."

On April 5, 2022, an intense low-end EF3 tornado impacted the southern and southeast side of the city, causing major damage to several structures and injuring one person. The tornado prompted a rare tornado emergency to be declared for the city by the National Weather Service office in Charleston, South Carolina.

== Geography ==
According to the United States Census Bureau, the town has a total area of 3.3 square miles (8.5 km^{2}), all land.

== Demographics ==
Historical population
Census	Pop.	Note	%±
1900	1,030		—
1910	1,453		41.1%
1920	1,893		30.3%
1930	2,068		9.2%
1940	2,217		7.2%
1950	2,474		11.6%
1960	3,114		25.9%
1970	3,620		16.2%
1980	4,400		21.5%
1990	4,410		0.2%
2000	4,052		−8.1%
2010	3,482		−14.1%
2020	2,694		−22.6%
U.S. Decennial Census

=== 2020 census ===
Allendale racial composition
Race	Num.	Perc.
White (non-Hispanic)	268	9.95%
Black or African American (non-Hispanic)	2,310	85.75%
Native American	9	0.33%
Asian	4	0.15%
Other/Mixed	48	1.78%
Hispanic or Latino	55	2.04%

As of the 2020 United States census, there were 2,694 people, 1,244 households, and 667 families residing in the town.

=== 2000 census ===
As of the census of 2000, there were 4,052 people, 1,542 households, and 997 families residing in the town. The population density was 1,225.2 inhabitants per square mile (473.1/km^{2}). There were 1,763 housing units at an average density of 533.1 per square mile (205.8/km^{2}). The racial makeup of the town was 18.19% White, 80.03% African American, 0.17% Asian, 0.17% Pacific Islander, 0.96% from other races, and 0.47% from two or more races. Hispanic or Latino of any race were 2.25% of the population.

There were 1,542 households, out of which 32.2% had children under the age of 18 living with them, 29.2% were married couples living together, 31.4% had a female householder with no husband present, and 35.3% were non-families. 31.4% of all households were made up of individuals, and 11.9% had someone living alone who was 65 years of age or older. The average household size was 2.61 and the average family size was 3.34.

In the town, the population was spread out, with 32.6% under the age of 18, 9.7% from 18 to 24, 24.0% from 25 to 44, 21.8% from 45 to 64, and 11.9% who were 65 years of age or older. The median age was 32 years. For every 100 females, there were 84.9 males. For every 100 females age 18 and over, there were 73.7 males.

The median income for a household in the town was $16,632, and the median income for a family was $21,167. Males had a median income of $22,800 versus $20,873 for females. The per capita income for the town was $10,433. About 36.7% of families and 41.2% of the population were below the poverty line, including 59.5% of those under age 18 and 21.1% of those age 65 or over.

== Education ==
Allendale County Schools provides education for elementary, middle and high school students while the University of South Carolina Salkehatchie established in 1965 is the only college in the small town.

Allendale has a public library, a branch of the Allendale Hampton Jasper Regional Library.

== Gallery ==
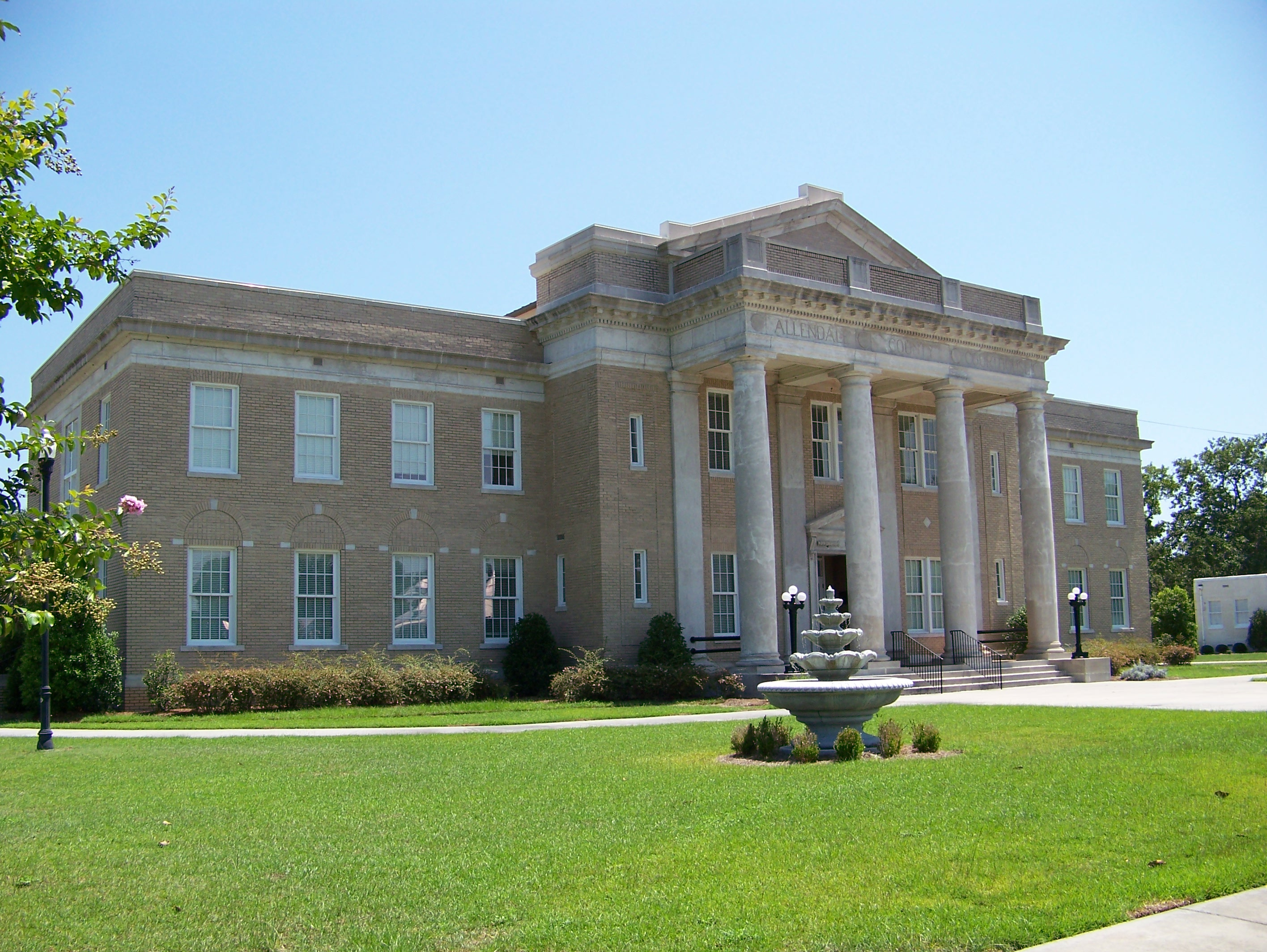
Allendale County Courthouse

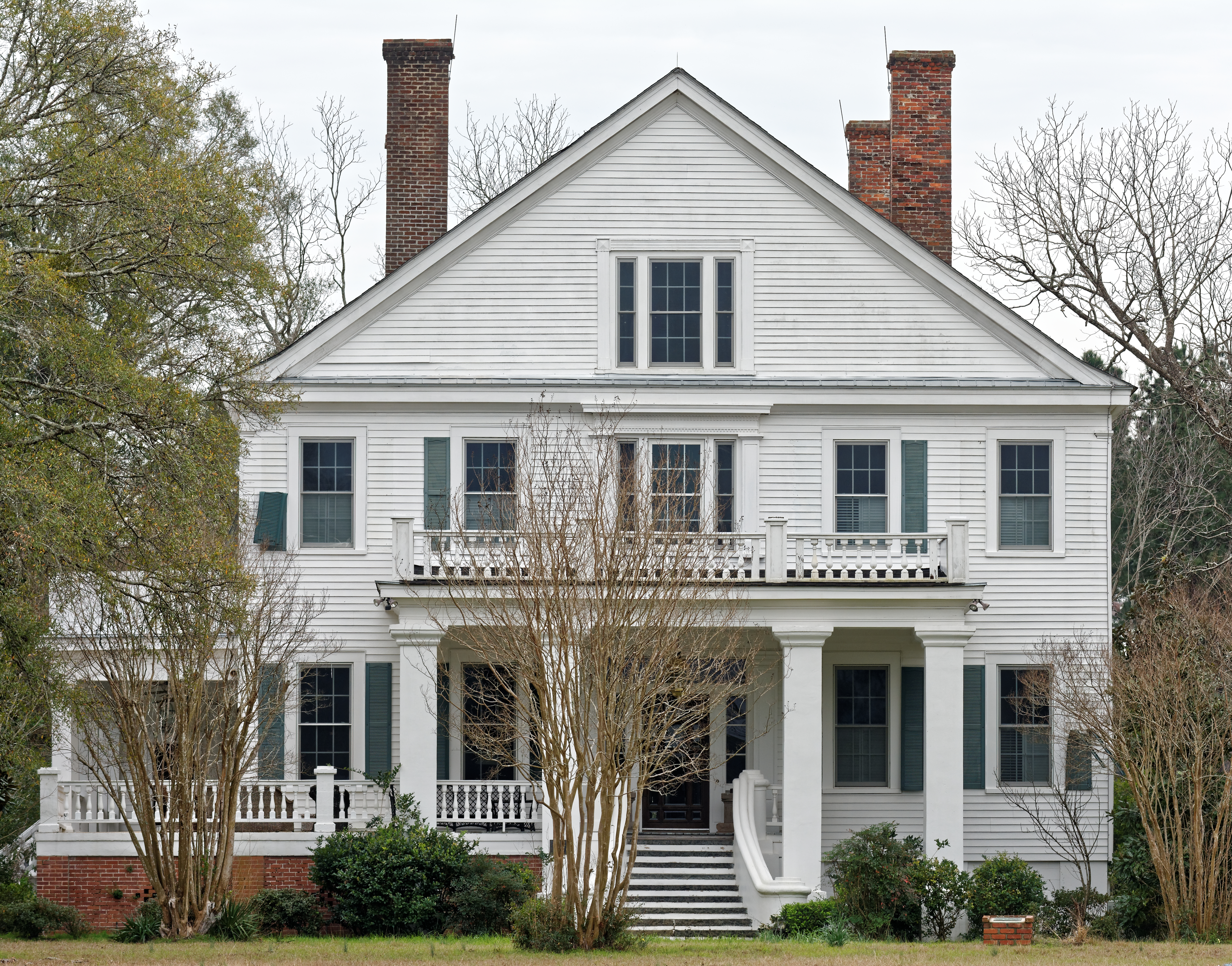
Gravel Hill Plantation

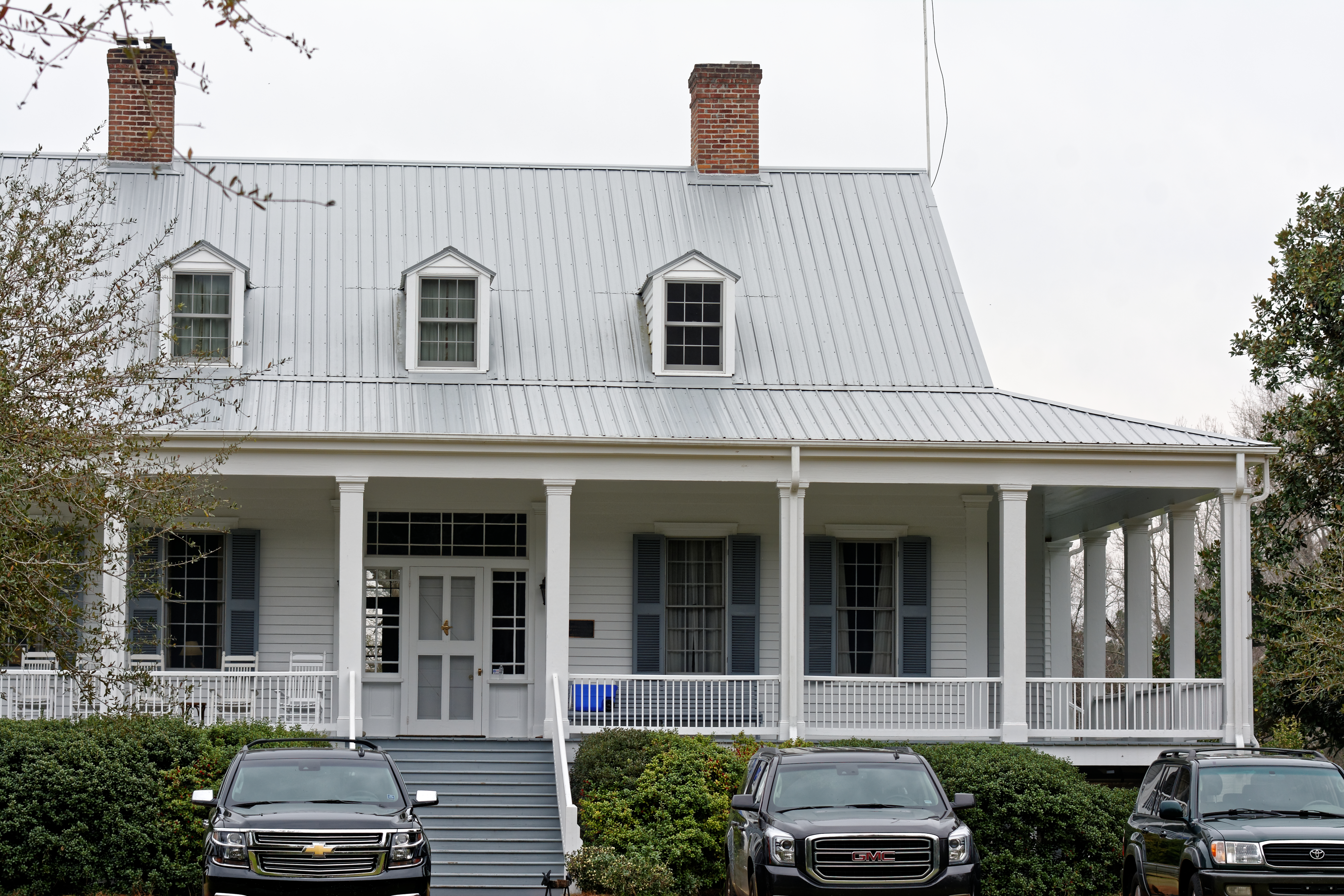
Erwin House

== Media ==
WEBA-TV/DT, a PBS station serving the South Carolina side of the Central Savannah River Area, is located here.

== Notable residents ==
- Roy C (1939–2020) — soul singer, songwriter, and record executive, who owned a record label and record store in Allendale
- George B. Daniels (born 1953) — federal judge
- Hilda Grayson Finney (1913–1976) — educator
- Jasper Johns (born 1930) — painter
