= Allendale County, South Carolina =

County in South Carolina, United States

- County
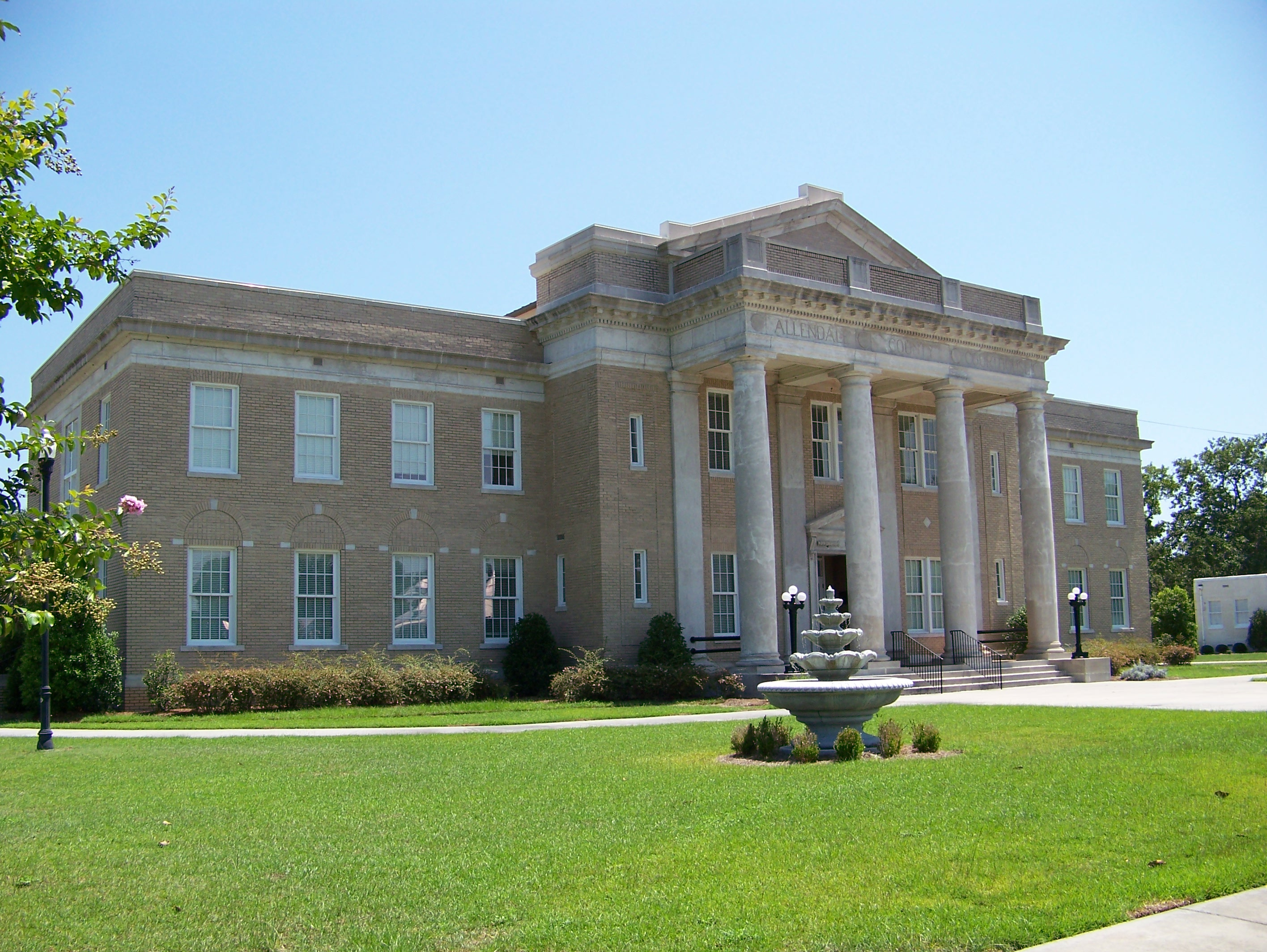
- Allendale County Courthouse

- Seal

- Location within the U.S. state of South Carolina
- Interactive map of Allendale County, South Carolina
- Coordinates: 32.98°N 81.36°W
- Country: United States
- State: South Carolina
- Founded: 1919
- Named for: Paul H. Allen
- Seat: Allendale
- Largest community: Allendale

Area
  - Total: 412.42 sq mi (1,068.2 km^{2})
  - Land: 408.10 sq mi (1,057.0 km^{2})
  - Water: 4.32 sq mi (11.2 km^{2}) 1.05%

Population (2020)
  - Total: 8,039
  - Estimate (2025): 7,355 ▼
  - Density: 19.70/sq mi (7.606/km^{2})
- Time zone: UTC−5 (Eastern)
  - Summer (DST): UTC−4 (EDT)
- Congressional district: 6th
- Website: www.allendalecounty.com

Allendale County is a county located in the U.S. state of South Carolina. As of the 2020 census, the population was 8,039, making it the least populous county in South Carolina. Its county seat is Allendale.

== History ==
Allendale County was formed in 1919 from southwestern portions of Barnwell County, along the Savannah River, and part of Hampton County, just to its south. It is the location of the Topper Site, an archeological excavation providing possible evidence of a pre-Clovis culture dating back 50,000 years. The site is near a source of chert on private land in Martin owned by Clariant Corporation, a Swiss chemical company with a plant there. The site, named after David Topper, has been under excavation by archeologists from the University of South Carolina for about one month a year since 1999, after an initial exploratory dig in the mid-1980s.

Allendale County was born out of a desire for convenience. Having a new county circumvented the need to travel to the courthouse in Barnwell or Hampton. The original Allendale County Courthouse burned down in May 1998, with reconstruction begun in August 2002. During the Civil Rights movement, the Courthouse almost became a site for a sit-in protest after African-American citizens charged officials with deliberately delaying the voter registration of Black residents.

== Geography ==
According to the U.S. Census Bureau, the county has a total area of 412.42 square miles (1,068.2 km^{2}), of which 408.10 square miles (1,057.0 km^{2}) is land and 4.32 square miles (11.2 km^{2}) (1.05%) is water. The Savannah River forms the county's western border with Georgia.

Allendale is 62 miles (100 km) from Augusta, Georgia; 73 miles (117 km) from Savannah, Georgia; 87 miles (140 km) from Columbia; and 90 miles (140 km) from Charleston. Before interstate highways were built, Allendale had several motels, primarily serving travelers in-between Northeastern states and Florida. Traffic that formerly traveled US 301 through Allendale now uses Interstate 95.

=== Major water bodies ===
- Coosawhatchie River
- Salkehatchie River
- Savannah River

=== Adjacent counties ===
- Bamberg County – northeast
- Colleton County – east
- Hampton County – southeast
- Screven County, Georgia – southwest
- Burke County, Georgia – west
- Barnwell County – northwest

=== Major highways ===
- US 278
- US 301
- US 321
- SC 3
- SC 47
- SC 125
- SC 300
- SC 641

=== Major infrastructure ===
- Savannah River Site (part)

== Demographics ==
Historical population
Census	Pop.	Note	%±
1920	16,098		—
1930	13,294		−17.4%
1940	13,040		−1.9%
1950	11,773		−9.7%
1960	11,362		−3.5%
1970	9,692		−14.7%
1980	10,700		10.4%
1990	11,722		9.6%
2000	11,211		−4.4%
2010	10,419		−7.1%
2020	8,039		−22.8%
2025 (est.)	7,355	▼	−8.5%
U.S. Decennial Census; 1790–1960 1900–1990; 1990–2000 2010 2020

=== Racial and ethnic composition ===
Allendale County, South Carolina – Racial and ethnic composition Note: the US Census treats Hispanic/Latino as an ethnic category. This table excludes Latinos from the racial categories and assigns them to a separate category. Hispanics/Latinos may be of any race.
Race / Ethnicity (NH = Non-Hispanic)	Pop 1980	Pop 1990	Pop 2000	Pop 2010	Pop 2020	% 1980	% 1990	% 2000	% 2010	% 2020
White alone (NH)	3,923	3,598	3,030	2,410	1,985	36.66%	30.69%	27.03%	23.13%	24.69%
Black or African American alone (NH)	6,559	7,939	7,927	7,645	5,646	61.30%	67.73%	70.71%	73.38%	70.23%
Native American or Alaska Native alone (NH)	4	11	10	19	45	0.04%	0.09%	0.09%	0.18%	0.56%
Asian alone (NH)	31	7	13	41	17	0.29%	0.06%	0.12%	0.39%	0.21%
Native Hawaiian or Pacific Islander alone (NH)	x	x	0	2	1	x	x	0.00%	0.02%	0.01%
Other race alone (NH)	11	6	8	5	13	0.10%	0.05%	0.07%	0.05%	0.16%
Mixed race or Multiracial (NH)	x	x	42	58	138	x	x	0.37%	0.56%	1.72%
Hispanic or Latino (any race)	172	161	181	239	194	1.61%	1.37%	1.61%	2.29%	2.41%
Total	10,700	11,722	11,211	10,419	8,039	100.00%	100.00%	100.00%	100.00%	100.00%

=== 2020 census ===
As of the 2020 census, the county had a population of 8,039, 3,281 households, and 1,389 families. The median age was 47.2 years, with medians of 51.4 for women and 44.5 for men; 16.8% of residents were under the age of 18 and 22.8% of residents were 65 years of age or older. For every 100 females there were 112.3 males, and for every 100 females age 18 and over there were 114.0 males age 18 and over.

The racial makeup of the county was 25.0% White, 70.4% Black or African American, 0.6% American Indian and Alaska Native, 0.2% Asian, 0.0% Native Hawaiian and Pacific Islander, 1.7% from some other race, and 2.1% from two or more races, while Hispanic or Latino residents of any race comprised 2.4% of the population.

0.0% of residents lived in urban areas, while 100.0% lived in rural areas. There were 3,281 households in the county, of which 23.7% had children under the age of 18 living with them and 43.6% had a female householder with no spouse or partner present. About 39.3% of all households were made up of individuals and 18.5% had someone living alone who was 65 years of age or older. There were 4,040 housing units, exceeding the number of households and of which 18.8% were vacant; among occupied units 64.4% were owner-occupied and 35.6% were renter-occupied. The homeowner vacancy rate was 1.8% and the rental vacancy rate was 7.8%, while the median household size was 2 (with a mean of 2.2).

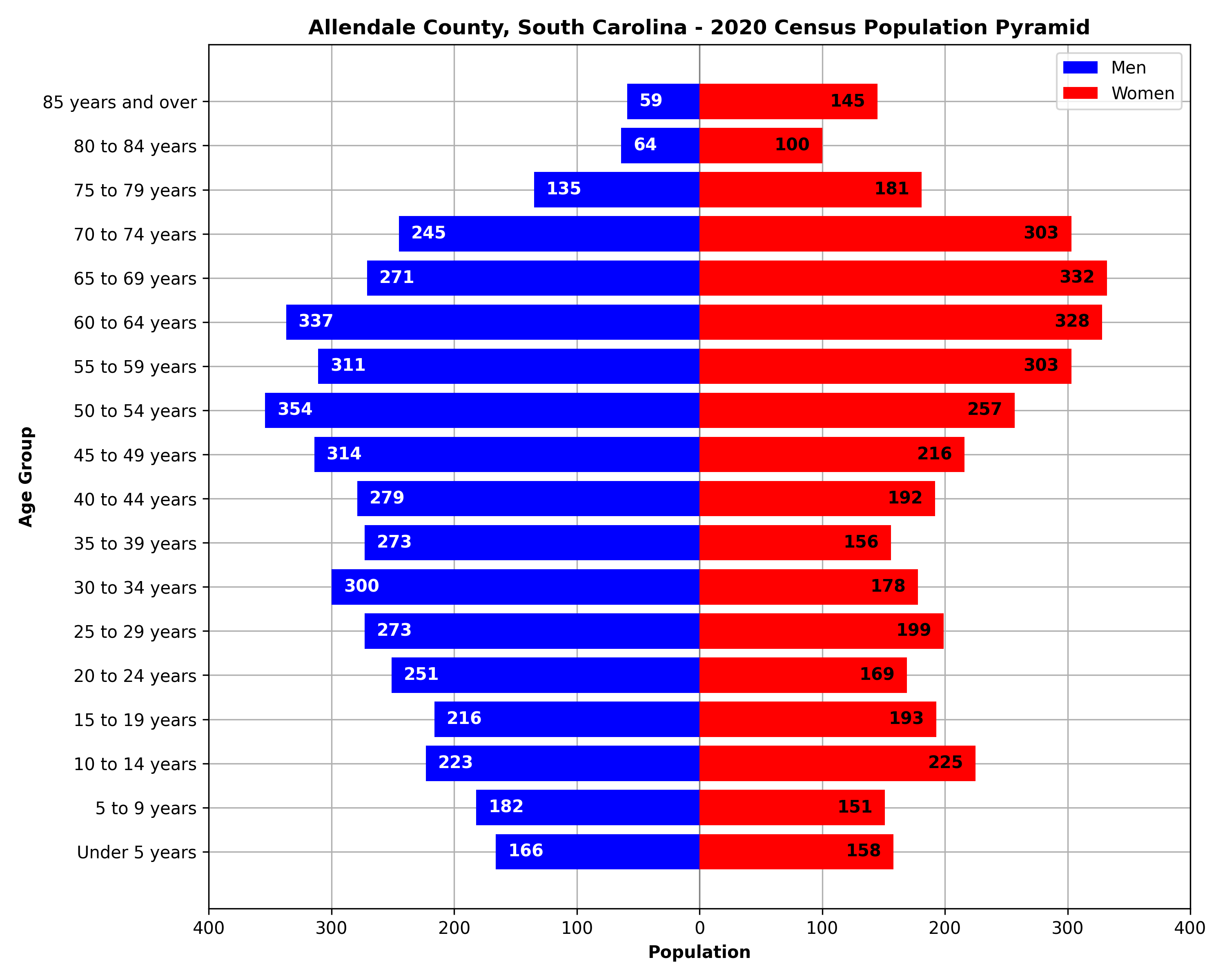
2020 age and sex demographics for Allendale County, visualized as a population pyramid

=== 2010 census ===
At the 2010 census, there were 10,419 people, 3,706 households, and 2,333 families living in the county. The population density was 25.5 inhabitants per square mile (9.8/km^{2}). There were 4,486 housing units at an average density of 11.0 per square mile (4.2/km^{2}). The racial makeup of the county was 73.6% Black or African American, 23.7% white, 0.4% Asian, 0.2% American Indian, 1.3% from other races, and 0.8% from two or more races. Those of Hispanic or Latino origin made up 2.3% of the population. In terms of ancestry, and 5.6% were American.

Of the 3,706 households, 32.2% had children under the age of 18 living with them, 31.5% were married couples living together, 26.9% had a female householder with no husband present, 37.0% were non-families, and 33.7% of households were made up of individuals. The average household size was 2.45 and the average family size was 3.14. The median age was 38.8 years.

The median household income was $20,081 and the median family income was $25,146. Males had a median income of $30,440 versus $28,889 for females. The per capita income for the county was $14,190. About 35.7% of families and 42.4% of the population were below the poverty line, including 53.8% of those under age 18 and 27.4% of those age 65 or over.

=== 2000 census ===
At the 2000 census, there were 11,211 people, 3,915 households, and 2,615 families living in the county. The population density was 28 people per square mile (11 people/km^{2}). There were 4,568 housing units at an average density of 11 per square mile (4.2/km^{2}). The racial makeup of the county was 71.0 percent Black or African American, 27.37 percent White, 0.12 percent Asian, 0.09 percent Native American, 0.06 percent Pacific Islander, 0.85 percent from other races, and 0.51 percent from two or more races. 1.61 percent of the population were Hispanic or Latino of any race. Of the 3,915 households, 30.3 percent had children under the age of 18 living with them, 35.8 percent were married couples living together, 25.8 percent had a female householder with no husband present, and 33.2 percent were non-families. 30.0 percent of all households were one person and 12.3 percent had someone living alone who was 65 or older. The average household size was 2.56 and the average family size was 3.21.

The age distribution was 26.6 percent under the age of 18, 9.8 percent from 18 to 24, 28.2 percent from 25 to 44, 22.8 percent from 45 to 64, and 12.7 percent who were 65 or older. The median age was 35 years. For every 100 females there were 108.6 males. For every 100 females age 18 and over, there were 107.5 males.

The median household income was $20,898 and the median family income was $27,348. Males had a median income of $25,930 versus $20,318 for females. The per capita income for the county was $11,293. About 28.4 percent of families and 34.5 percent of the population were below the poverty line, including 48.1 percent of those under age 18 and 26.00 percent of those age 65 or over.

== Government and politics ==
=== County Council ===
Allendale County has a five-member council elected from single-member districts. The council has a single chairman. Council members serve four-year terms.

Allendale County Council Elected Members
	2020
District 1	Theresa Taylor
District 2	James White, Jr.
District 3	Willa Jennings
District 4	Matthew Connelly, Chair
District 5	William Robinson, Vice Chair

=== Other County Officials ===
Allendale County Elected Officials
	2020
Sheriff	James Freeman
Treasurer	Alice Kirkland
Clerk of Court	Elaine Sabb (since 2007)
Cororner	Renique Riley
Probate Judge	D. Keith Smith

=== S.C. Senate ===
Leading up to the 2020 Census Redistricting, Allendale County was divided between Senate districts 40 (the eastern half) and 45 (the western half). Senate District 40 has been represented by Democrat and Minority Leader Brad Hutto since 1996. Democrat Margie Bright Matthews has represented District 45 since 2015, after she was elected to the position to fulfill the unexpired term of Clementa C. Pinckney.

Following the redistricting, which will be used in the 2024 United States elections despite legal disputes over racial and political gerrymandering, Allendale County is solely covered by state Senate District 40.

Senators representing Allendale County in the South Carolina Senate
Name	Years active	Party	District	Other Counties
(John) Henry Johnson	1920–1923		At-large	
Robinson Plato Searson, Jr.	1923–1926 1931–1938		At-large	
George Dunbar Kirkland	1927–1930		At-large	
James Martin Thomas	1939–1942 1947–1950		At-large	
William Edwin Myrick	1943–1946 1951–1962		At-large	
Audrey Patterson Williams	1963–1966		At-large	
Edgar Allan Brown	1967–1972	Democratic	18 (1967–1968) 12 (1969–1972)	Bamberg, Barnwell
James P. Harrelson	1973–1976	Democratic	15	Beaufort, Colleton, Hampton, Jasper
James Madison Wadell, Jr.	1973–1984	Democratic	15	Beaufort, Colleton, Hampton, Jasper
William Tindall Howell	1977–1979	Democratic	15	Beaufort, Colleton, Hampton, Jasper
Peden B. McLeod	1980–1990	Democratic	15 (1980–1984) 45 (1985–1990)	Beaufort, Charleston (1985–1990), Colleton, Hampton, Jasper
John W. Matthews Jr.	1985–2002	Democratic	39	Bamberg, Barnwell, Calhoun, Dorchester, Orangeburg
McKinley Washington Jr.	1990–1992	Democratic	45	Beaufort, Charleston, Colleton, Hampton, Jasper
Bradley Hutto	2003–present	Democratic	40 (2003–2012) 40 (2013–present)	Bamberg (2013–present), Barnwell, Colleton (2013–present), Hampton, Orangeburg
Clementa Pinckney	2003–2015	Democratic	45	Beaufort, Charleston, Colleton, Hampton, Jasper
Margie Bright Matthews	2015–2024	Democratic	45	Beaufort, Charleston, Colleton, Hampton, Jasper

=== U.S. Presidential elections ===
Allendale County has been consistently Democratic in Presidential voting since 1976 and was among the few counties to be carried by Walter Mondale in 1984. In the 2008 U.S. presidential election Barack Obama received 75.3 percent of the county's vote. In the 2012 U.S. presidential election Barack Obama received 79.2 percent of the county's vote. In the 2020 U.S. presidential election, Joe Biden received 75.6% of the vote. In 2024, the county saw a slight rightward shift, but it was still by far the most Democratic county in the state of South Carolina in that election.

United States presidential election results for Allendale County, South Carolina
Year	Republican		Democratic		Third party(ies)	
Year	No.	%	No.	%	No.	%
1920	11	2.44%	440	97.56%	0	0.00%
1924	14	3.02%	450	96.98%	0	0.00%
1928	24	2.86%	816	97.14%	0	0.00%
1932	10	0.89%	1,108	99.11%	0	0.00%
1936	3	0.24%	1,236	99.76%	0	0.00%
1940	30	3.21%	905	96.79%	0	0.00%
1944	8	1.11%	678	94.43%	32	4.46%
1948	14	1.26%	55	4.95%	1,041	93.78%
1952	751	63.06%	440	36.94%	0	0.00%
1956	262	19.89%	380	28.85%	675	51.25%
1960	888	60.37%	583	39.63%	0	0.00%
1964	1,740	69.27%	772	30.73%	0	0.00%
1968	997	29.72%	1,538	45.84%	820	24.44%
1972	1,741	55.34%	1,386	44.06%	19	0.60%
1976	1,064	28.69%	2,634	71.02%	11	0.30%
1980	1,182	29.62%	2,778	69.62%	30	0.75%
1984	1,570	41.66%	2,170	57.57%	29	0.77%
1988	1,295	41.59%	1,796	57.68%	23	0.74%
1992	1,049	30.36%	2,159	62.49%	247	7.15%
1996	941	28.75%	2,222	67.89%	110	3.36%
2000	967	28.95%	2,338	70.00%	35	1.05%
2004	985	27.43%	2,565	71.43%	41	1.14%
2008	947	23.53%	3,029	75.27%	48	1.19%
2012	838	20.13%	3,297	79.20%	28	0.67%
2016	789	21.97%	2,735	76.14%	68	1.89%
2020	835	23.24%	2,718	75.65%	40	1.11%
2024	813	26.89%	2,165	71.62%	45	1.49%

== Economy ==
Allendale is primarily an agricultural rural county. Its primary products are cotton, soybeans, watermelon and cantaloupe. Timbering is also important, primarily for paper pulp.

In 2022, Allendale's GDP was $317.5 million (approx. $39,491 per capita). In chained 2017 dollars, its real GDP was $240.4 million (approx. $29,902 per capita). From 2021 through 2024, its unemployment rate has fluctuated between 4-8%.

As of April 2024, some of the largest employers in the county include Atlantic Power Corporation, AZ Electronic Materials, Georgia-Pacific, South Carolina Department of Corrections (SCDC), and the University of South Carolina.

Employment and Wage Statistics by Industry in Allendale County, South Carolina
Industry	Employment Counts	Employment Percentage (%)	Average Annual Wage ($)
Accommodation and Food Services	46	2.0	15,808
Administrative and Support and Waste Management and Remediation Services	13	0.6	28,600
Agriculture, Forestry, Fishing and Hunting	117	5.0	46,124
Construction	20	0.9	30,472
Educational Services	280	12.0	50,336
Finance and Insurance	30	1.3	38,740
Health Care and Social Assistance	360	15.4	43,264
Manufacturing	782	33.5	85,228
Other Services (except Public Administration)	4	0.2	18,200
Professional, Scientific, and Technical Services	32	1.4	51,064
Public Administration	382	16.4	49,868
Retail Trade	140	6.0	19,708
Transportation and Warehousing	58	2.5	53,300
Wholesale Trade	68	2.9	58,708
Total	2,332	100.0%	57,969

== Education ==
=== Colleges and universities ===
- USC-Salkahatchie (a two-year campus): Robert McNair, Democratic Governor of South Carolina from 1965 to 1971, moved to Allendale County as an adult because his wife was from there. Because of McNair's influence, USC Salk is located in the town of Allendale.
- Denmark Tech: Part of the state Technical College System, Denmark Tech serves the county from its location in Bamberg County, 25 miles (40 km) from Allendale.

The county is also the site of WEBA, Channel 14, a broadcast outlet of the South Carolina Educational Television Network. Ranking 45th in population among the state's 46 counties, it is the smallest county to have either a state-supported college or an ETV station.

=== K-12 education ===
There is one school district: Allendale County School District.

Allendale County School District includes one high school: Allendale-Fairfax High School. The former C. V. Bing High School served African-American students until desegregation. Allendale Training School preceded it.

== Media ==
Allendale County is a news desert. The last local news publications, The Citizen-Leader and The Allendale Sun, stopped printing in 2014 and 2015, respectively.

== Communities ==
=== Towns ===
- Allendale (county seat and largest community)
- Fairfax
- Sycamore
- Ulmer

=== Unincorporated communities ===
- Appleton
- Martin

== See also ==
- List of counties in South Carolina
- National Register of Historic Places listings in Allendale County, South Carolina
