= Abraham Andrews Barker =

American politician

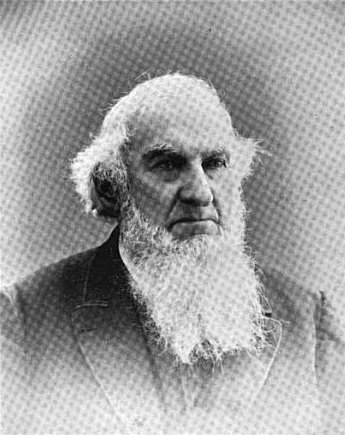

Member of the U.S. House of Representatives from Pennsylvania's 17th District
- In office March 4, 1865 – March 4, 1867
- Preceded by: Archibald McAllister
- Succeeded by: Daniel J. Morrell

Personal details
- Born: March 30, 1816 Lovell, Massachusetts (now Maine)
- Died: March 18, 1898 (aged 81) Altoona, Pennsylvania
- Party: Republican Party (1860-1876); Prohibition Party (1876-1898)

Abraham Andrews Barker (March 30, 1816 – March 18, 1898) served as a soldier during the American Civil War, and was a Republican member of the U.S. House of Representatives from Pennsylvania.

== Early life and career ==
Barker was born in Lovell in Massachusetts' District of Maine. His parents were Stephen Barker and Betsey Andrews. Barker received a small education, up until he was sixteen. In 1842, he married Orsina Little. Orsina was the granddaughter of Jonathan Clark and Moses Little. Barker engaged in agricultural pursuits and also in the shook business. He moved to Carrolltown, Pennsylvania, in 1854 and later to Ebensburg, Pennsylvania, where he continued the shook business. Barker also worked with Neal Dow in favor of the Maine law. Barker was an ardent prohibitionist. He also engaged in the mercantile business in 1858 and later in the lumber business. He became the president of the Ebensburg and Cresson Branch Railroad, until it was taken over by the Pennsylvania Railroad.

== Political Career and later life ==
Barker was a delegate to the 1860 Republican National Convention. He cast his vote for the nomination of Abraham Lincoln at the convention. During the American Civil War, he served in Company E, Fourth Regiment, Pennsylvania Emergency Troops. Barker was elected as a Republican to the Thirty-ninth Congress. He was an unsuccessful candidate for renomination in 1866 and for election as a Republican in 1872. After leaving congress, Barker left the Republican Party to join to the Prohibition Party in 1876. From 1878 to 1882, Barker served as the president of the Pennsylvania Prohibition Party. He reengaged in the lumber and shook business until 1880. Barker was also highly involved in Freemasonry. In 1896 Barker was nominated to run for congress by the Prohibition Party. This was his final political race, and he lost. He died in Altoona, Pennsylvania, while on a visit for medical treatment in 1898.

== Notes ==
U.S. House of Representatives
Preceded by Archibald McAllister	Member of the U.S. House of Representatives from Pennsylvania's 17th congressional district 1865–1867	Succeeded by Daniel Johnson Morrell
