= List of the oldest buildings in Georgia (U.S. state) =

This article attempts to list the oldest extant buildings surviving in the state of Georgia in the United States of America, including the oldest houses in Georgia and any other surviving structures. Some dates are approximate and based upon dendochronology, architectural studies, and historical records. With the founding of Savannah in 1733 as a British colony, Georgia was the last and southernmost of the original Thirteen Colonies to be established. A select few surviving buildings date to this colonial period before the American Revolutionary War. To be listed here a site must:

- date to the year 1799 or prior to; or
- be the oldest building in a county, large city, or oldest of its type (church, government building, etc.)

Building	Image	Location	First built	Use	Notes
Horton House		Jekyll Island	1743	House	One of the oldest tabby concrete buildings in Georgia
Wild Heron		near Savannah	1756	Plantation house	One of the oldest documented houses in Georgia
Jerusalem Lutheran Church		Ebenezer	1769	Church	Oldest church building in Georgia and the oldest continuous Lutheran congregation in the U.S.
Glen Echo		Ellabell	1773	House	
Eppinger House		Chatham	c. 1776	House	Believed to be the oldest extant brick building in the state
Old Rock House		McDuffie County	1786	House	Oldest well-documented house in Georgia
Thornton House		Stone Mountain	1790 (circa)	House	One of the oldest houses in the state
Pirates' House		Savannah	1794	House	
Drouillard-Maupas House		Savannah	1799	House	Oldest surviving building in the Thomas Square District, predating the surrounding street grid
Springfield Baptist Church		Augusta	1801	Church	Oldest surviving building in Augusta, rare example of New England meetinghouse style in Georgia
First Presbyterian Church		Augusta	1804	Church	Possibly oldest Presbyterian church in Georgia
Elisha Winn House		Dacula	1812 (circa)	House	Oldest surviving house in metro Atlanta. The location of Gwinnett County's first government
First Baptist Church		Savannah	1833	Church	Oldest surviving church in Savannah
Pine Log Methodist Church		Rydal	1842	Church	Oldest continuously used church in Northwest Georgia
Meadow Nook		Atlanta	1856	House	Oldest surviving house in Atlanta in its original location
Congregation Mickve Israel		Savannah	1878	Synagogue	Oldest synagogue in Georgia

== See also ==
- List of oldest structures in Atlanta
- List of the oldest buildings in the United States
- National Register of Historic Places listings in Georgia
