= Argyle, Georgia =

- Town
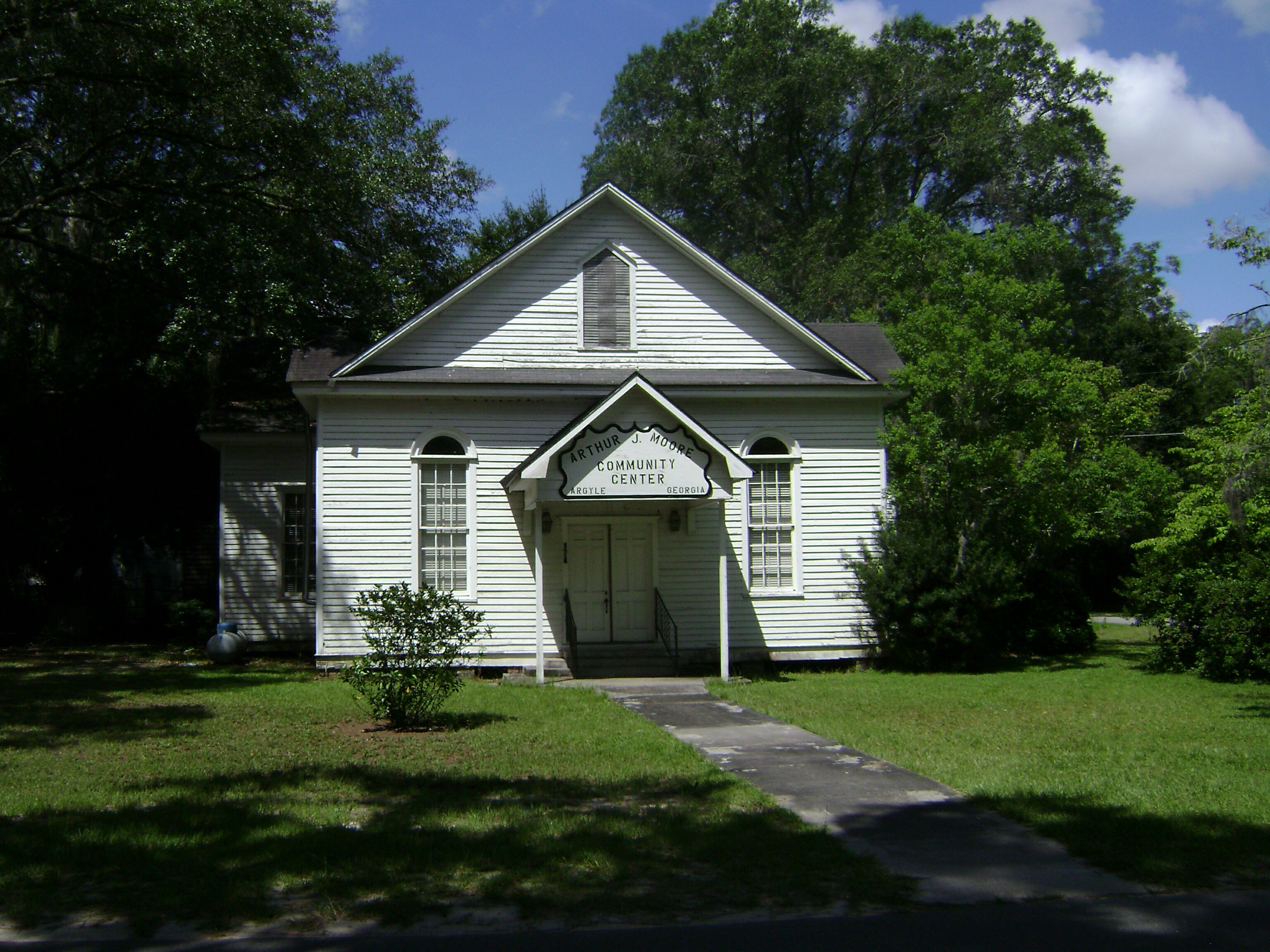
- Argyle Community Center

- Location in Clinch County and the state of Georgia
- Coordinates: 31°4′26″N 82°38′57″W
- Country: United States
- State: Georgia
- County: Clinch

Government
  - Mayor: Kaye Riley
  - City Council Officials: Mitchell Lee Lane, Otis Fleming, Ann Grady, Delois King

Area
  - Total: 1.72 sq mi (4.45 km^{2})
  - Land: 1.72 sq mi (4.45 km^{2})
  - Water: 0 sq mi (0.00 km^{2})
- Elevation: 161 ft (49 m)

Population (2020)
  - Total: 190
  - Density: 110.5/sq mi (42.66/km^{2})
- Time zone: UTC-5 (Eastern (EST))
  - Summer (DST): UTC-4 (EDT)
- ZIP code: 31623
- Area code: 912
- FIPS code: 13-02844
- GNIS feature ID: 0354387
- Website: https://argylega.com/

Argyle is a town in Clinch County, Georgia, United States. As of the 2020 census, the city had a population of 190.

== History ==
The community takes its name from Fort Argyle, near Savannah. A post office called Argyle has been in operation since 1882. The town was incorporated in 1901.

== Geography ==
Argyle is located at 31°04′26″N 82°38′57″W.

According to the United States Census Bureau, the town has a total area of 1.7 square miles (4.4 km^{2}), all of it land.

The climate in this area is characterized by relatively high temperatures and evenly distributed precipitation throughout the year. According to the Köppen Climate Classification system, Argyle has a Humid subtropical climate, abbreviated "Cfa" on climate maps.

Climate data for Argyle, Georgia
| Month | Jan | Feb | Mar | Apr | May | Jun | Jul | Aug | Sep | Oct | Nov | Dec | Year |
|---|---|---|---|---|---|---|---|---|---|---|---|---|---|
| Mean daily maximum °C (°F) | 17 (62) | 19 (66) | 23 (73) | 27 (80) | 30 (86) | 32 (90) | 33 (92) | 33 (91) | 31 (87) | 27 (80) | 22 (72) | 18 (64) | 26 (79) |
| Mean daily minimum °C (°F) | 3 (37) | 4 (40) | 7 (45) | 11 (51) | 15 (59) | 19 (66) | 21 (69) | 21 (69) | 18 (65) | 12 (54) | 7 (45) | 4 (39) | 12 (53) |
| Average precipitation mm (inches) | 110 (4.5) | 100 (4.1) | 120 (4.8) | 84 (3.3) | 89 (3.5) | 140 (5.6) | 160 (6.4) | 160 (6.2) | 110 (4.3) | 66 (2.6) | 64 (2.5) | 89 (3.5) | 1,310 (51.4) |
Source: Weatherbase

== Demographics ==
Historical population
| Census | Pop. | Note | %± |
|---|---|---|---|
| 1910 | 180 | | — |
| 1920 | 332 | | 84.4% |
| 1930 | 311 | | −6.3% |
| 1940 | 278 | | −10.6% |
| 1950 | 244 | | −12.2% |
| 1960 | 225 | | −7.8% |
| 1970 | 206 | | −8.4% |
| 1980 | 206 | | 0.0% |
| 1990 | 206 | | 0.0% |
| 2000 | 151 | | −26.7% |
| 2010 | 212 | | 40.4% |
| 2020 | 190 | | −10.4% |
U.S. Decennial Census; 1850-1870 1870-1880; 1890-1910 1920-1930; 1940 1950 1960; 1970 1980 1990; 2000 2010

As of the census of 2000, there were 151 people, 49 households, and 39 families residing in the town. By the 2020 census, its population grew to 190 people.
