= Old Rock House (Thomson, Georgia) =

Historic house in Georgia, United States

- U.S. National Register of Historic Places
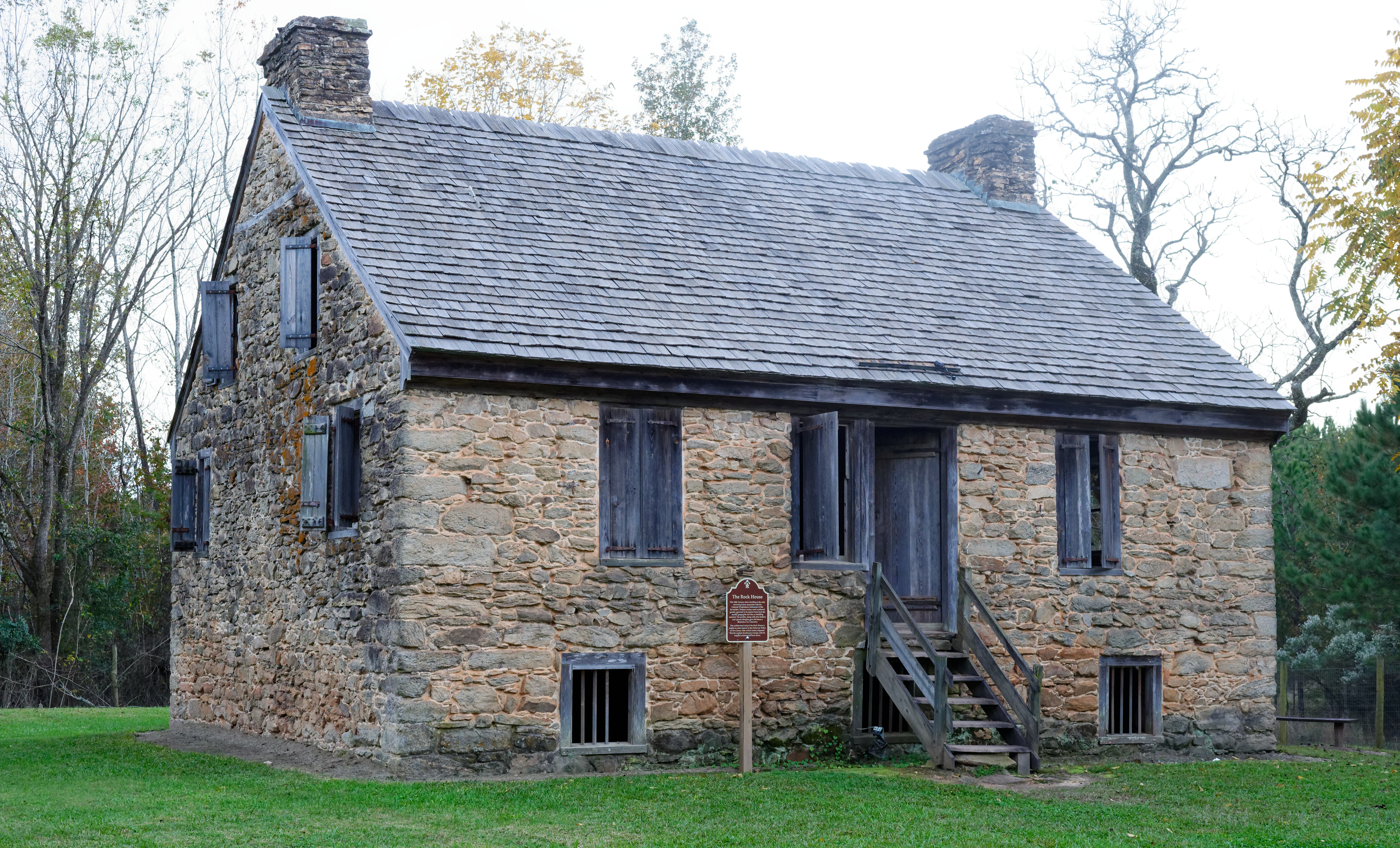

- Location within Georgia Location within the United States
- Nearest city: Thomson, Georgia
- Coordinates: 33.4823°N 82.5579°W
- Area: 1 acre (0.40 ha)
- Built: 1784
- Architect: Ansley, Thomas
- Architectural style: Garrison House
- NRHP reference No.: 70000841
- Added to NRHP: December 29, 1970

Old Rock House is a historic garrison house in Thomson, Georgia.

The fortified stone house was built about 1785 by Thomas Ansley. The house was purportedly the home to ancestors of former president Jimmy Carter. The building was added to the National Register of Historic Places in 1970.

The house was owned by the Wrightsborough Quaker Community Foundation, Inc., in 1970. It is owned by McDuffie County. It is the oldest well-documented house in Georgia, although there may be older ones.

== See also ==
- List of the oldest buildings in Georgia
