= Thornton House (Stone Mountain, Georgia) =

Historic house in Georgia, United States

Coordinates: 33°48′56.55″N 84°8′37.98″W

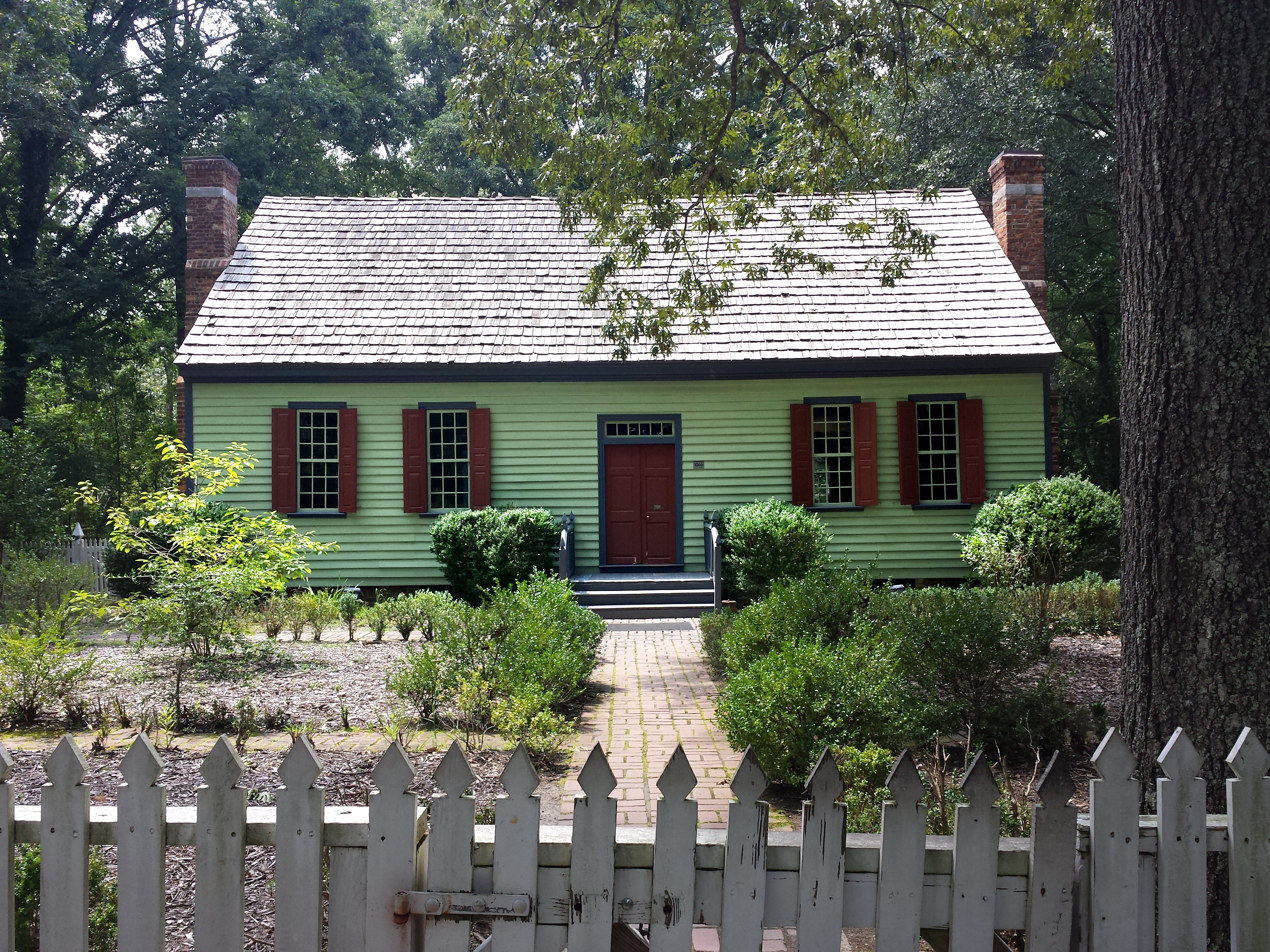
The building in 2014

Thornton House is a historic house in Stone Mountain, Georgia.

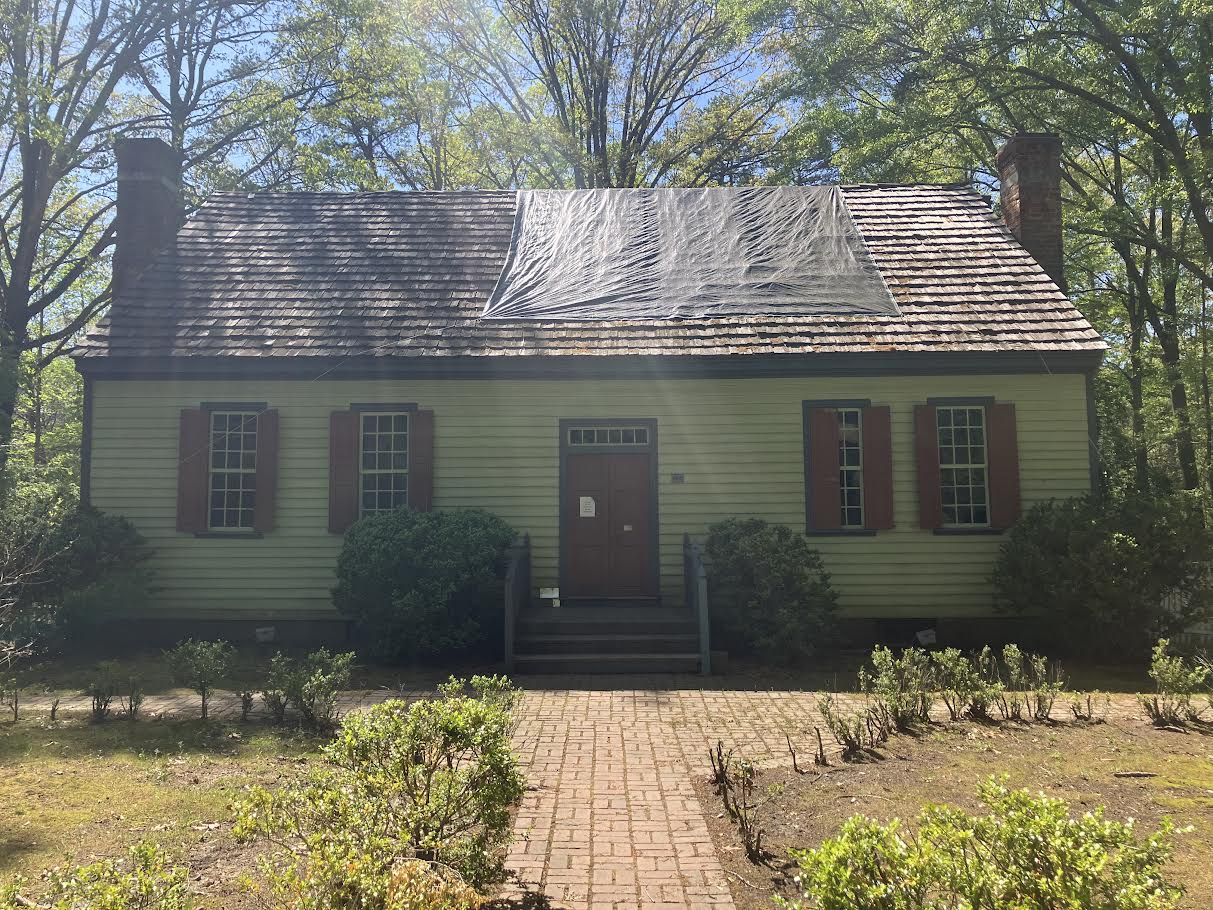
Front of House (April 2025)

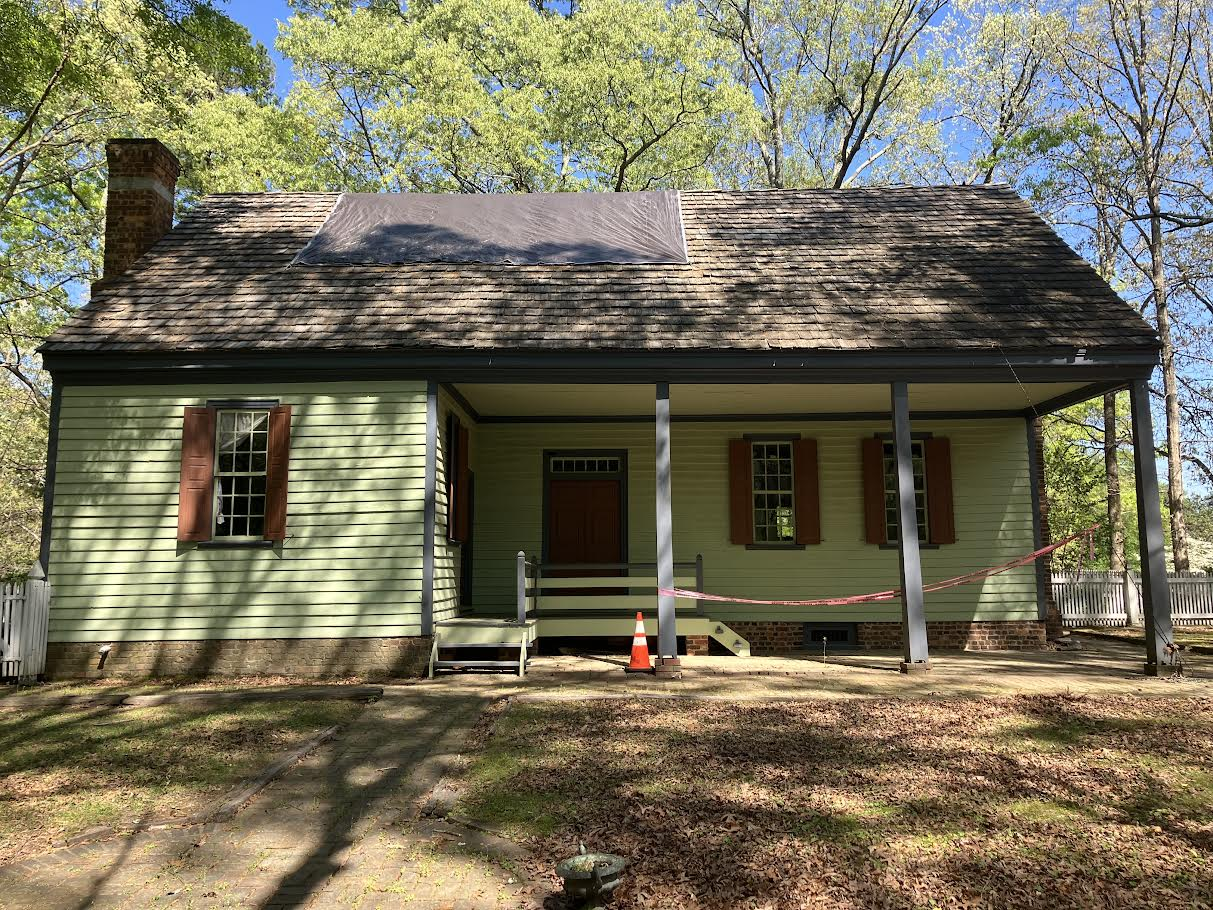
Back of the House (April 2025)

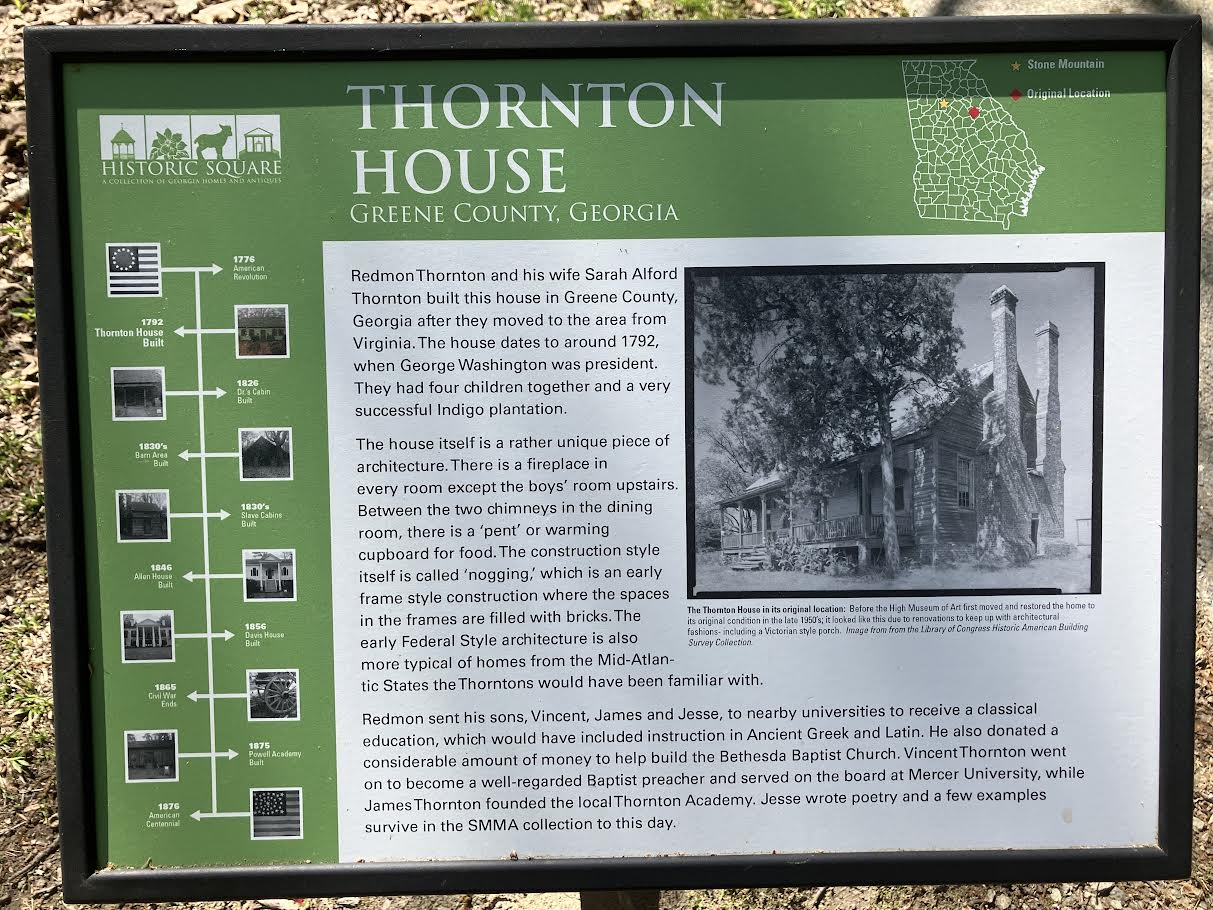
Sign in Front of Thornton House

Thomas Redman Thornton (1769–1826) constructed the house around 1790 at Union Point, Georgia. The house was moved in the late 1960s by the Atlanta Art Association to a location behind the High Museum of Art in Midtown Atlanta. Then the house was moved again in 1968 for final reconstruction in Stone Mountain Park.

== See also ==
- List of the oldest buildings in Georgia
