= Kilkenny (Richmond Hill, Georgia) =

Historic house in Georgia, United States

- U.S. National Register of Historic Places
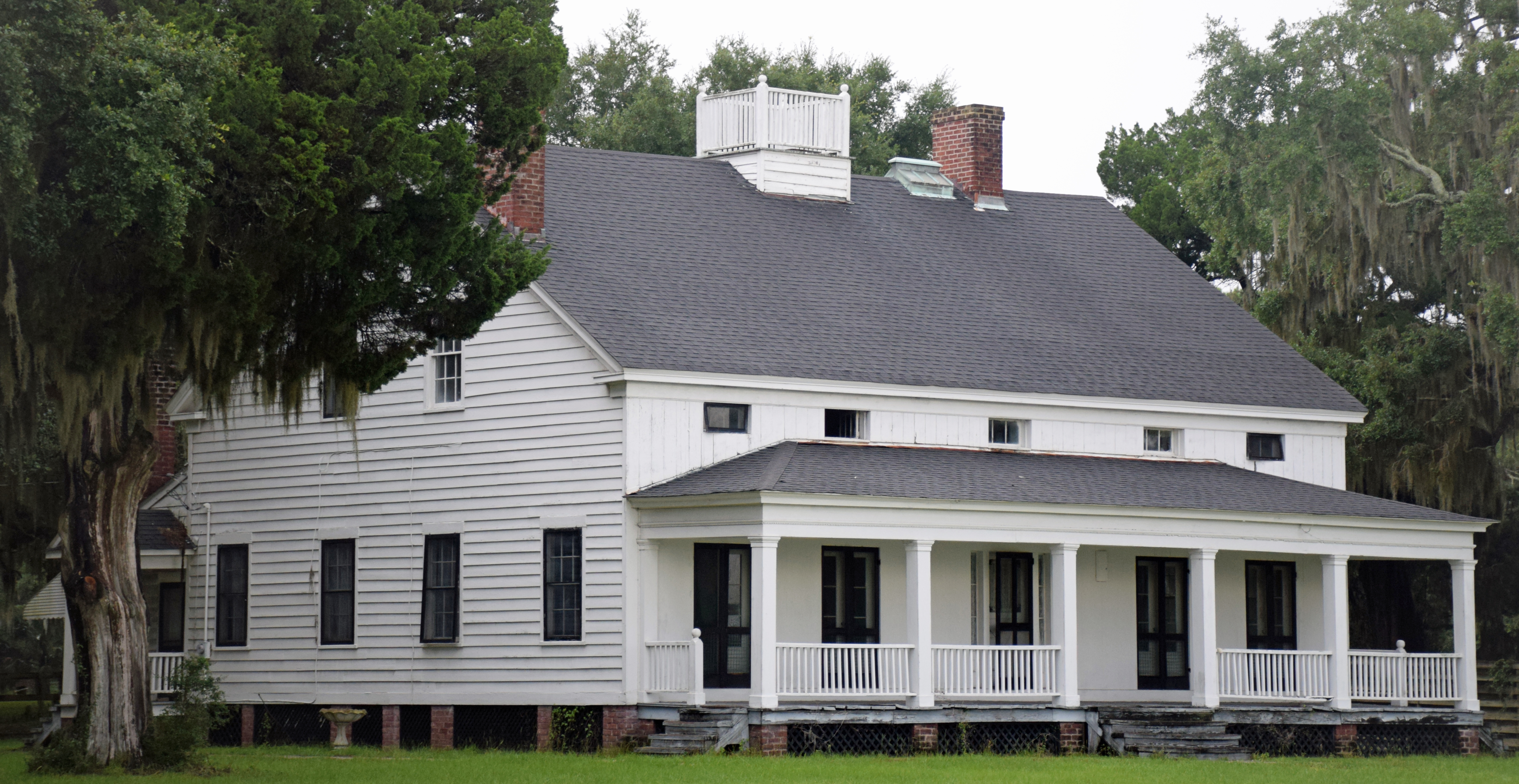

- Location within Georgia Location within the United States
- Nearest city: Richmond Hill, Georgia
- Coordinates: 31.78995°N 81.20339°W
- Area: 1 acre (0.40 ha)
- NRHP reference No.: 79000700
- Added to NRHP: February 14, 1979

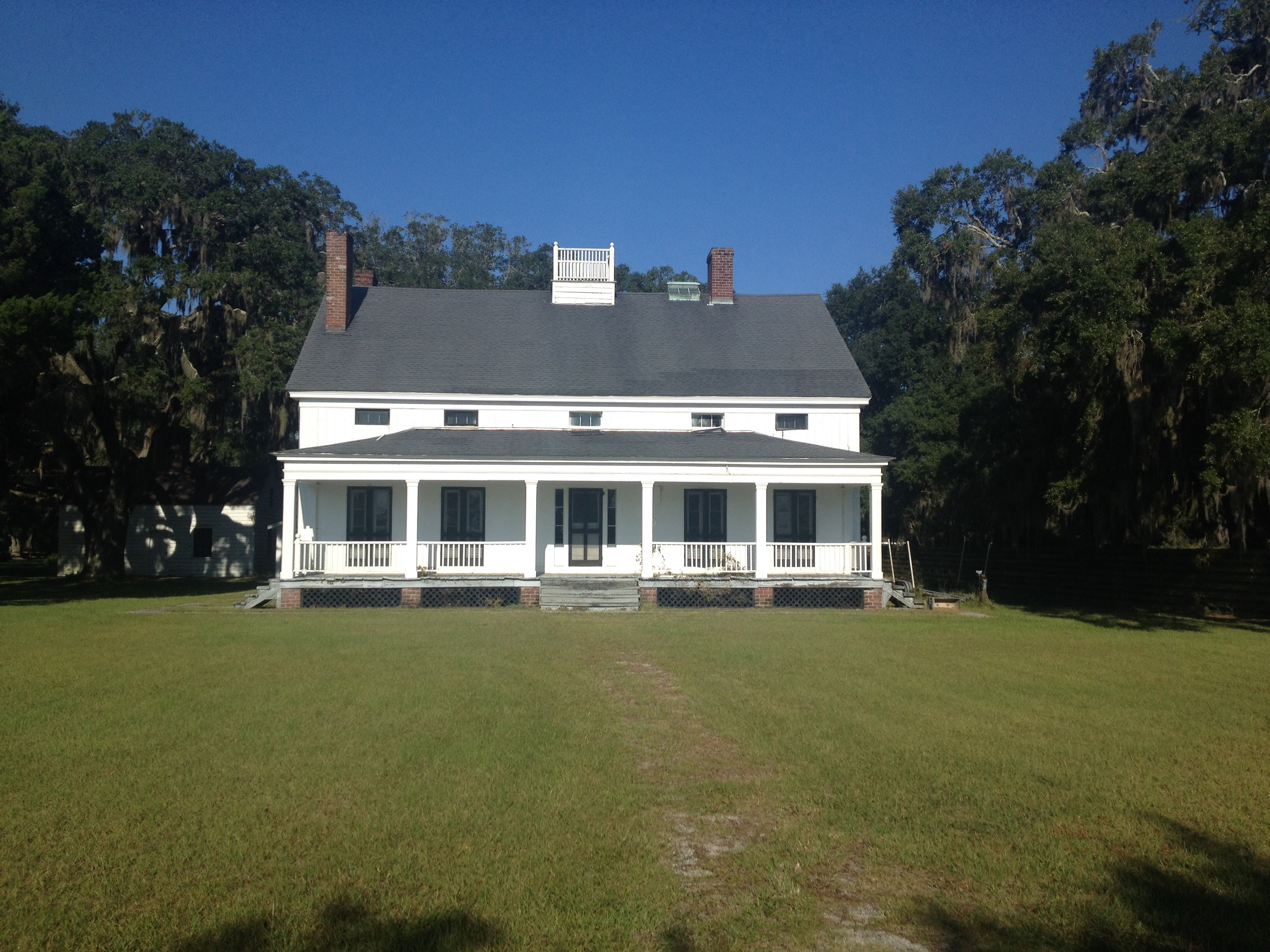
Kilkenny

Kilkenny (Note: Pronounced /kɪlˈkeɪniː/ kil-KAY-nee) is a historic estate in Bryan County, Georgia listed on the National Register of Historic Places.

== History ==
The 662-acre pre-American Revolutionary War property was in the possession of Thomas Young (1733–1808) from about 1758. The executors of Young's estate sold Kilkenny to Charles Rogers of Savannah and Sapelo Island on January 21, 1836. The land was used to raise Sea Island cotton. Rogers built a wooden frame house around 1845 that still exists. A Union gunboat shelled the property from the Bear River during the U.S. Civil War.

Kilkenny plantation was purchased by James M. Butler in 1874; it was then acquired by James H. Furber in January 1890 and became home to the Kilkenny Club, a seven-member consortium who took over the plantation and its house to host summer fishing vacations. In 1889 a well was drilled. By 1913, when the property was sold to a Mr. R. C. Paschall, the house itself was in considerable disrepair.

The property was owned by Former Tennessee governor John Cox. It was later restored as a private home following Henry Ford's acquisition of the property in 1930. The house was placed on the National Register of Historic Places on February 14, 1979.

== Location ==
Kilkenny is east of Richmond Hill, Georgia, situated at the southeast end of Kilkenny Road and the western shore of Kilkenny Creek. The property fronts the creek and overlooks tidal salt marsh out towards the St. Catherines Islands and Ossabaw Islands, with access to St. Catherine's Sound. A nearby tidal station is named for the Kilkenny Club.

== See also ==
- National Register of Historic Places listings in Bryan County, Georgia
