= James Mackay (British Army officer) =

British Army captain (1718–1785)

- Born: c. 1718; Scotland
- Died: 1785 (aged 66–67) Alexandria, Virginia
- Allegiance: Great Britain
- Branch: Militia
- Service years: 17??–1755
- Rank: Captain
- Conflicts: French and Indian War; Battle of Fort Necessity (surrendered)
- Children: 3

James Mackay (c. 1718–1785) was a Scottish captain in the British Army during the French and Indian War. He was in command of an Independent Company of South Carolina when he was sent by the Governor of South Carolina to assist Virginia's defense of the Ohio Country from the French in the summer of 1754. He was co-commander of Fort Necessity along with George Washington during the Battle of the Great Meadows on 3 July 1754.

== Biography ==
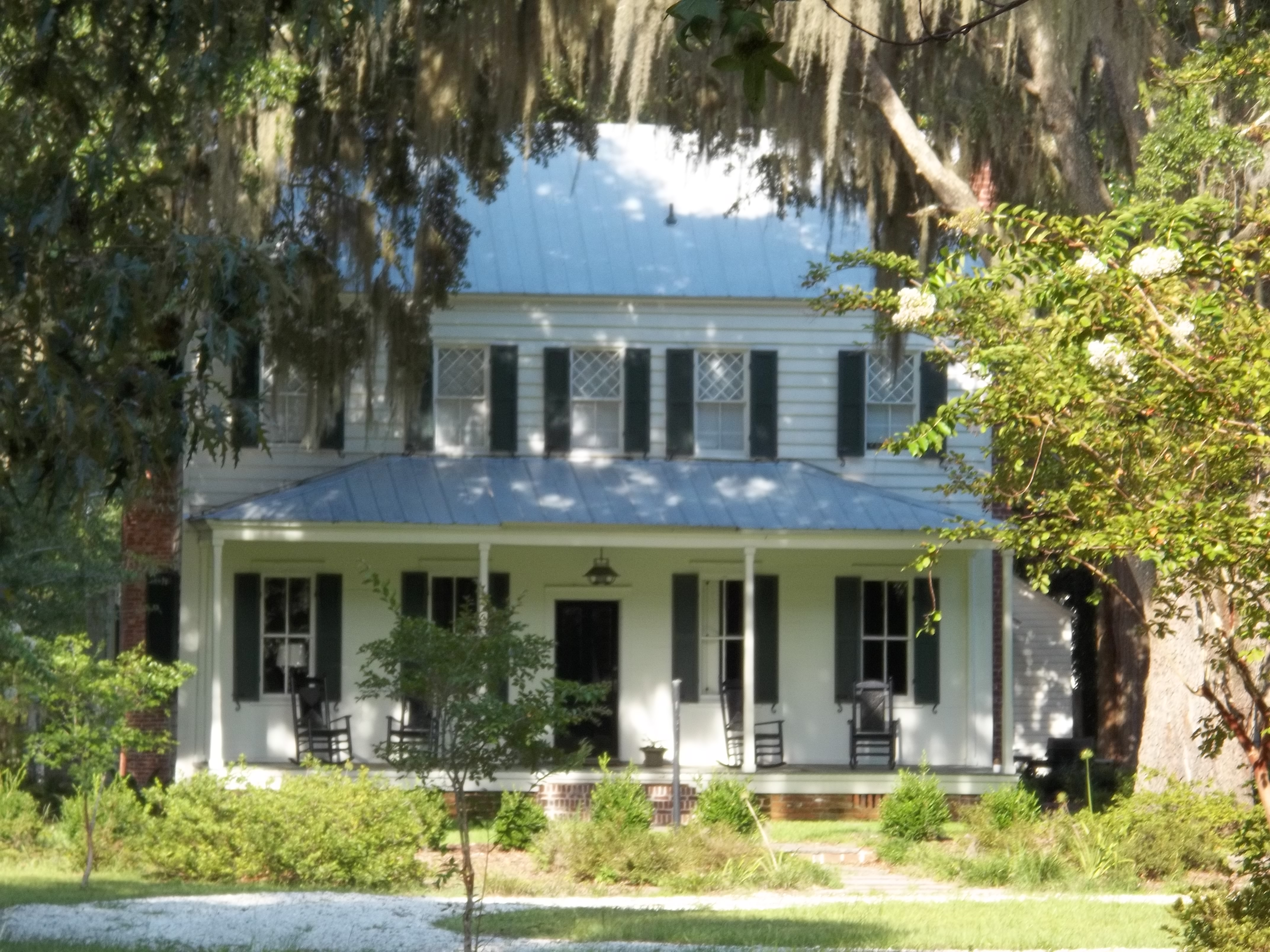
The second and current Strathy Hall mansion. The original was destroyed in the early 19th century

Born c. 1718 in Scotland, the son of Captain Hugh Mackay, James came to North America in 1732 with his father and three brothers as part of General James Oglethorpe's expedition that founded Georgia Colony. He descended from the Mackays of Scoury.

After leaving the military in 1755, Mackay moved to Georgia and purchased 500 acres of land, which he named Strathy Hall, in reference to a family estate in Scotland.

Mackay fell ill and died in 1785 in Alexandria, Virginia, while on his way to visit Washington at Mount Vernon. He was father of three daughters, Mary, Ann and Barbara.
