= William Clark =

American explorer and territorial governor (1770–1838)

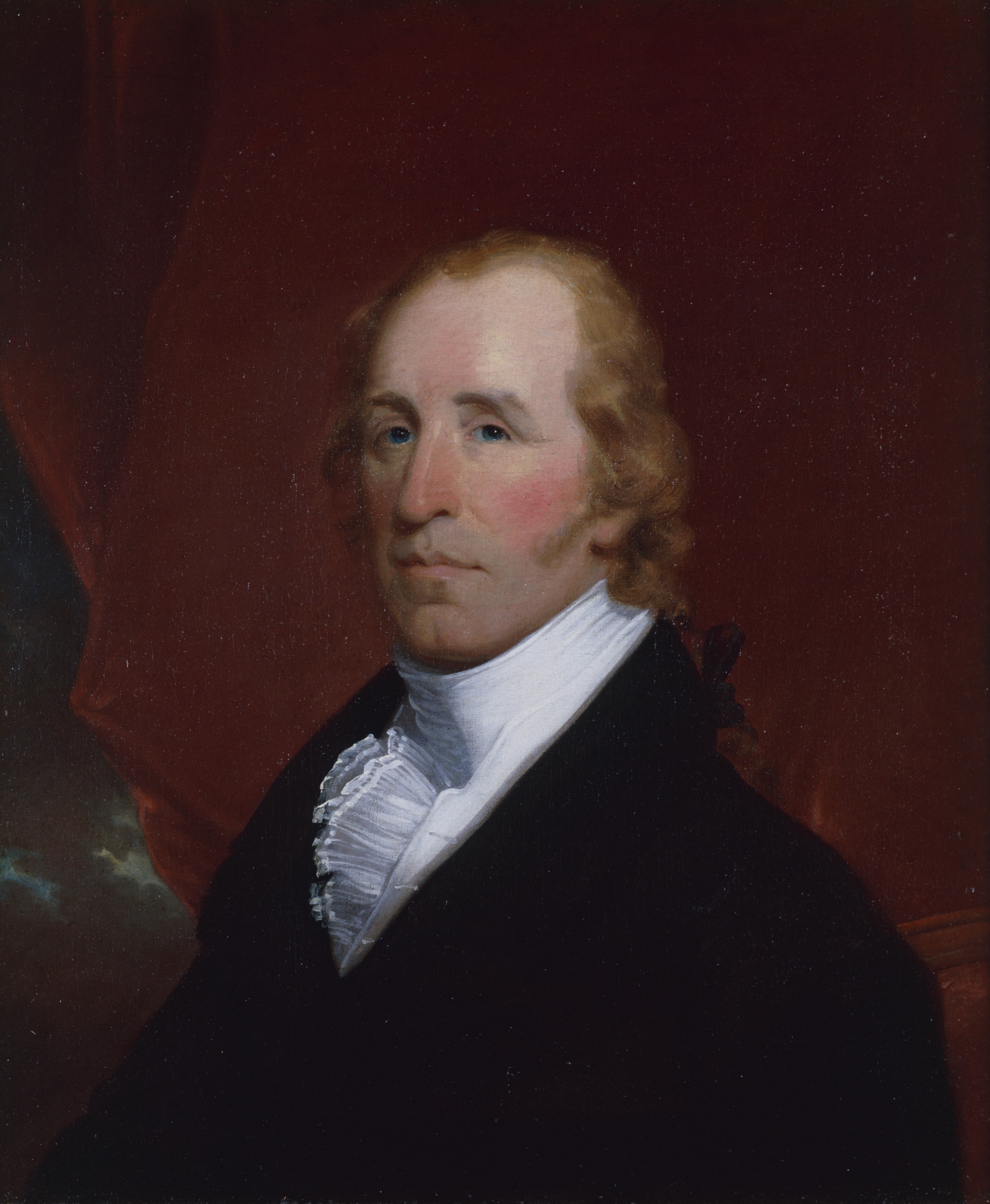
- Portrait by John Wesley Jarvis, c. 1810

4th Governor of Missouri Territory
- In office July 1, 1813 – September 18, 1820
- Appointed by: James Madison
- Preceded by: Benjamin Howard
- Succeeded by: Alexander McNair

Superintendent of Indian Affairs
- In office May 28, 1822 – September 1, 1838
- Preceded by: Position established
- Succeeded by: Joshua Pilcher

Personal details
- Born: August 1, 1770 Ladysmith, Colony of Virginia
- Died: September 1, 1838 (aged 68) St. Louis, Missouri, U.S.
- Spouses: Julia Hancock (m. 1808; died 1820); Harriet Kennerly Radford (m. 1820; died 1831)
- Relations: Jonathan Clark (brother); George Rogers Clark (brother)
- Children: 6, including Meriwether Lewis Clark Sr.
- Occupation: Soldier; explorer; politician
- Military career
- Branch: Kentucky Militia; Infantry; Artillery; Louisiana Militia
- Service years: 1789-1791 (Kentucky Militia); 1792–1796 (Army); 1804–1807 (Army); 1807-1814 (Louisiana Militia)
- Rank: Ensign (Kentucky Militia); Lieutenant (Regular Army); Brigadier General (Militia)
- Units: Legion of the United States; Regiment of Artillerists
- Commands: Corps of Discovery
- Conflicts: Northwest Indian War; Battle of Fallen Timbers; War of 1812

William Clark (August 1, 1770 – September 1, 1838) was an American explorer, soldier, Indian agent, and territorial governor. A native of Virginia, he grew up in pre-statehood Kentucky before later settling in what became the state of Missouri.

Along with Meriwether Lewis, Clark led the Lewis and Clark Expedition of 1804–1806 across the Louisiana Purchase to the Pacific Ocean, the first major effort to explore and map much of what is now the Western United States and to assert American claims to the Pacific Northwest. Before the expedition, he served in a militia and the United States Army. Afterward, he served in a militia and as governor of the Missouri Territory. From 1822 until his death in 1838, he served as a U.S. Superintendent of Indian Affairs in St. Louis.

== Early life ==
William Clark was born in Caroline County, Virginia, on August 1, 1770, the ninth of ten children of John and Ann Rogers Clark. His parents were natives of King and Queen County, and were of English and possibly Scots ancestry. The Clarks were planters in Virginia, owned several modest estates, and claimed ownership of several enslaved African Americans. They were members of the Anglican Church.

Clark did not have any formal education; like many of his contemporaries, he was tutored at home. In later years, he was self-conscious about his convoluted grammar and inconsistent spelling—he spelled "Sioux" 27 different ways in his journals of the Lewis and Clark Expedition—and sought to have his journals corrected before publication. The spelling of American English was not standardized in Clark's youth, but his vocabulary suggests he was well read.

Clark's five older brothers fought in Virginia units during the American Revolutionary War (1775–1783), but William was too young. His oldest brother, Jonathan Clark, served as a colonel during the war, rising to the rank of brigadier general in the Virginia militia years afterward. His second-oldest brother, George Rogers Clark, rose to the rank of general, spending most of the war in Kentucky fighting against British-allied Native Americans. After the war, the two oldest Clark brothers made arrangements for their parents and family to relocate to Kentucky.

William, his parents, his three sisters, and the enslaved people claimed by the family arrived in Kentucky in March 1785, having first traveled overland to Redstone Landing in present-day Brownsville, Pennsylvania. They completed the journey down the Ohio River by flatboat. The Clark family settled at "Mulberry Hill", a plantation along Beargrass Creek near Louisville. This was William Clark's primary home until 1803. In Kentucky, his older brother George Rogers Clark taught William wilderness survival skills.

== Military career begins ==
Kentuckians fought the Northwest Indian War against Native Americans, who were trying to preserve their territory north of the Ohio River. In 1789, 19-year-old William Clark joined a volunteer militia force under Major John Hardin. Clark kept a detailed journal of the expedition, beginning a lifelong practice. Hardin was advancing against the Wea Indians, who had been raiding settlements in Kentucky, on the Wabash River. In error, the undisciplined Kentucky militia attacked a peaceful Shawnee hunting camp, where they killed a total of eight men, women, and children.

In 1790, Clark was commissioned by General Arthur St. Clair, governor of the Northwest Territory, as a captain in the Clarksville, Indiana militia. One older source says he was sent on a mission to the Creek and Cherokee, whom the US hoped to keep out of the war, in the Southeast. His responsibilities are unclear. He may have visited New Orleans at that time. His travels prevented him from participating in General Josiah Harmar's disastrous campaign into the Northwest Territory that year.

In 1791, Clark served as an ensign and acting lieutenant with expeditions under generals Charles Scott and James Wilkinson. He enlisted in the Legion of the United States and was commissioned as a lieutenant on March 6, 1792, under Anthony Wayne. On September 4, 1792, he was assigned to the 4th Sub-Legion. He was involved in several skirmishes with Indians during the continuing Northwest Indian War. At the Battle of Fallen Timbers in 1794, Clark commanded a company of riflemen who drove back the enemy on the left flank, killing a number of Native Americans and Canadians. This decisive US victory brought the Northwest Indian War to an end. In 1795, Clark was dispatched on a mission to New Madrid, Missouri. Clark also served as an adjutant and quartermaster while in the militia.

== Lewis and Clark Expedition ==
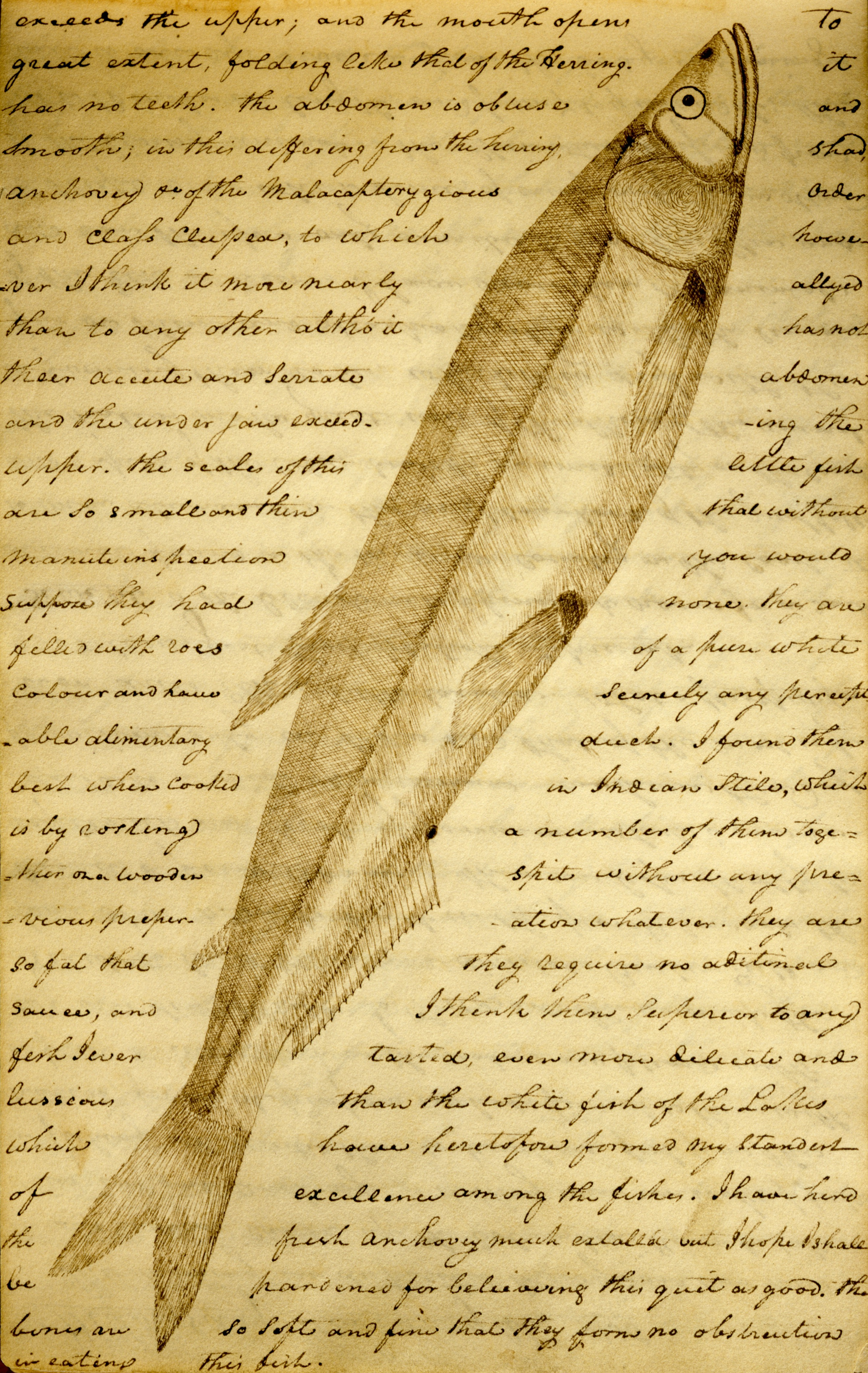
"Candlefish" or "Eulachon" (Thaleichthys pacificus) art is the first ever documentation of this species in a Lewis and Clark Expedition journal on February 25, 1806.

William Clark resigned his commission on July 4, 1796, and retired due to poor health, although he was only 26 years old. He returned to Mulberry Hill, his family's plantation near Louisville. His father died in 1799, at which point William Clark inherited York and possibly other slaves.

In 1803, Meriwether Lewis recruited Clark, then age 33, to share command of the newly formed Corps of Discovery, whose mission was to explore the territory of the Louisiana Purchase, establish trade with Native Americans, and consolidate the sovereignty of the US. They were to find a waterway from the US to the Pacific Ocean and claim the Oregon territory for the United States before European nations did. Clark spent three years on the expedition to the Pacific Coast.

Clark took his personal slave York, a large, strong, dark man, on the expedition. Indigenous nations treated York with respect, and many of the Native Americans were interested in his appearance, which "played a key role in diplomatic relations".

Although Clark was refused a promotion to the rank of captain when Jefferson asked the Senate to appoint him, at Lewis' insistence, he exercised equal authority, and continued the mission. Clark concentrated chiefly on the drawing of maps, the management of the expedition's supplies, and leading hunting expeditions for game.

== Indigenous nations and war ==
In 1807, President Jefferson appointed Clark as the brigadier general of the militia in the Louisiana Territory, and the US agent for Indian affairs. At the time, trade was a major goal and the US established the factory system. The government and its appointees licensed traders to set up trading posts in Native American territory. Native American relations were handled in what became the War Department. Clark set up his headquarters in St. Louis, Missouri, where he would live for most of the rest of his life.

There he became a member of the Freemasons, a secret fraternal group. The records of his initiation do not exist, but on September 18, 1809, Saint Louis Lodge No. 111 issued a traveling certificate for Clark.

As a reward for their contributions during their expedition to the Pacific Lewis and Clark were given government positions. Jefferson appointed Meriwether Lewis territorial governor of Upper Louisiana, commander-in-chief of the militia, and superintendent of Indian Affairs. Although he was in charge of Indian affairs, Clark was under the supervision of the Governor of the Louisiana Territory. The governor had final say of all decisions made in the territory. Although Clark had primary duties in dealing with the Native Americans, "the territorial governor held the title of ex officio superintendent of Indian affairs.

Clark's experiences during his cross-continent expedition gave him the tools to be the ideal candidate for a diplomat to the Native Americans. That was Jefferson's motives behind giving Clark these duties, although it would not be until Madison's presidency that Clark's title became official. President James Madison appointed Clark as Missouri territorial governor and thus ex officio superintendent of Indian affairs in that region, during the summers of 1808 and 1813. In the earlier period, Clark performed the same duties that he would have if he held the title. During the years while Clark held position under Governor Lewis, he was continuously involved in decision-making with him. Clark was consulted on affairs on a regular basis. In Louisiana and Missouri, Clark served the United States government for the longest term in history as diplomat to the Native American peoples.

Indian diplomacy occupied much of Clark's time; the dutiful soldier and bureaucrat never wavered in his commitment to an expansionist national agenda that expected Indians to surrender their lands, abandon their traditional ways, and acquiesce to the dictates of the U.S. government. But he was aware of the consequences and he demonstrated genuine concern for the plight of destitute native people increasingly threatened with extinction, so much so that Indian-hating frontier settlers called him an "Indian lover". Clark's expeditions and frontier settlement gave him unique views and feelings toward Native Americans. He felt as though he held a firm hand when he had to, but at the same time he had passion towards them as people still deserving of rights. At times he was said to be too compassionate. Clark took his position as one of extreme importance to not only the government of the United States, but to the Native American people as well.

Clark recognized Indians' nationalism, their history, language, culture, and territory and negotiated treaties between the various nations and his. He tried to protect Indians and preserve their culture by removing them from the influences of white society, providing life-saving inoculations, having their portraits painted, and assembling a museum of Indian artifacts. At the same time, he removed Indians from their ancestral lands; encouraged federal "civilization" and "education" programs to change native lifestyles, religious beliefs, and cultural practices; and usually promoted the interests of American citizens over Indian needs and desires.

During the War of 1812, Clark led several campaigns, among them in 1814, one along the Mississippi River, up to the Prairie du Chien area. He established the short-lived Fort Shelby, the first post in what is now Wisconsin. Soon, the post was captured by the British.

== Governor of Missouri ==
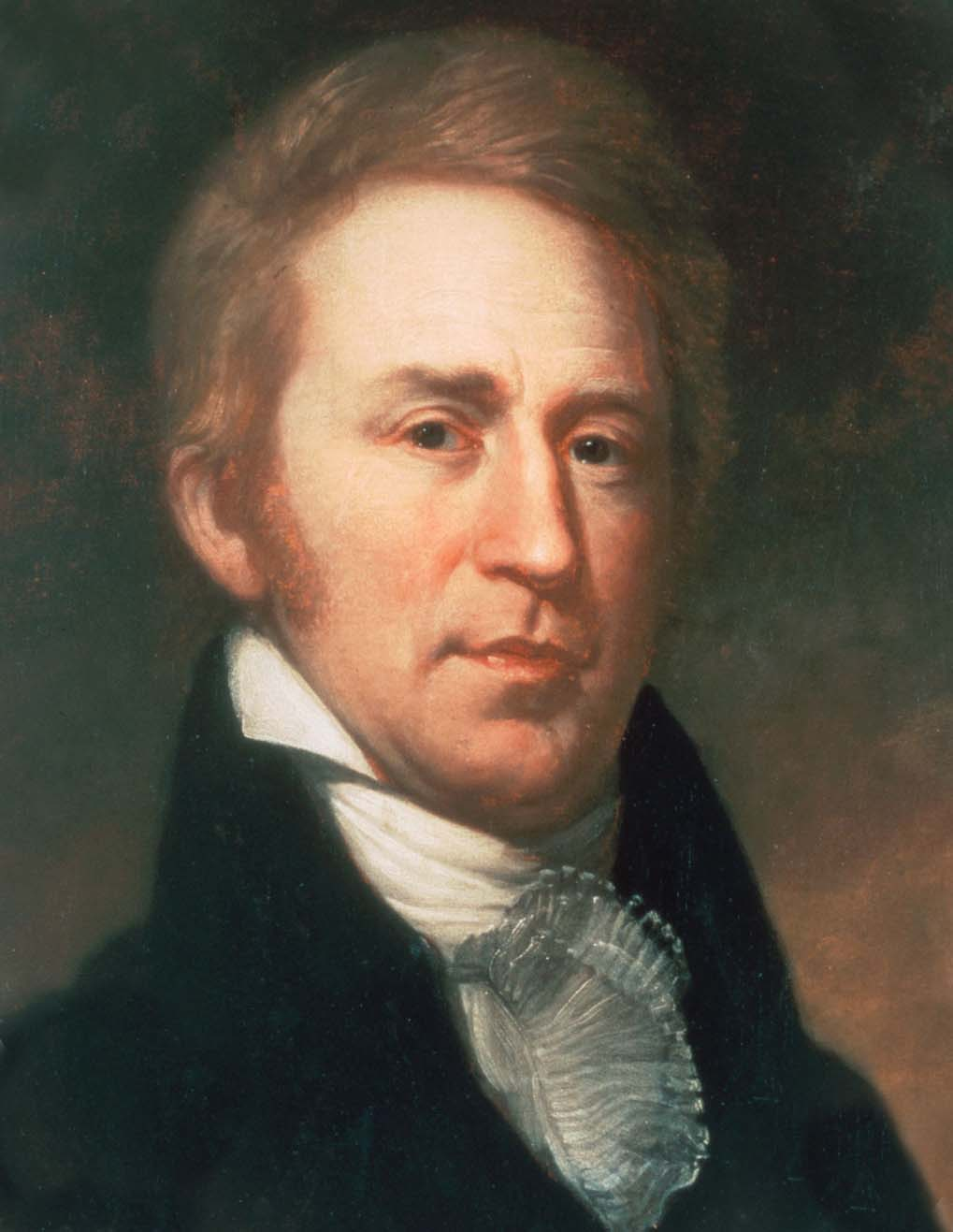
Portrait of Clark by Charles Willson Peale, c. 1810

When the Missouri Territory was formed in 1813, Clark was appointed as the governor by President Madison. He was reappointed to the position by Madison in 1816, and in 1820 by President Monroe.

William Clark appeared before Supreme Court Judge John B.C. Lucas in St. Louis on July 6, 1813, to take the oath of office as governor of the Missouri Territory. Clark's road to a gubernatorial appointment was long and complex. Upon Lewis' appointment by Jefferson, Clark backed him and at times filled the role of governor without holding official position, due to Lewis' complications in life, whether it was debt, loneliness, or drinking. Upon the death of Lewis in 1809, Clark declined to take office for varying reasons.

By the time he was appointed governor, Clark appreciated his own capabilities and embraced them rather than turning them away. Clark held office for the next seven years until he was voted out of office in 1820, in the first election after Missouri became a state. He was defeated by Alexander McNair.

== Superintendent of Indian Affairs ==
In 1822, Clark was appointed Superintendent of Indian Affairs by President James Monroe, a new position created by Congress after the factory system was abolished. Clark served in that position until his death; his title changed with the creation of the Office of Indian Affairs in 1824 and finally the Bureau of Indian Affairs in 1829, both within the War Department. From 1824 to 1825, he was additionally appointed surveyor general of Illinois, Missouri, and the Territory of Arkansaw. It was around this time that Clark received a rare smoking pipe or calumet as a gift from a Potowatomi chief in Missouri. The pipe is held in the British Museum's collection.

As the Superintendent of Indian Affairs, Clark was the most important man on Native American matters west of the Mississippi. As superintendent at St. Louis, Clark took on some additional duties: he issued licenses and granted passports to traders and travelers; provided payments for injuries and injustices to both whites and Indians; invoked military force to arrest lawbreakers; prevented or terminated hostilities between tribes; removed unauthorized persons from Indian country or confiscated their property; established, marked, and surveyed boundaries; distributed annuities and made sure that treaty provisions were delivered; and conducted treaty councils. Of the four superintendents of Indian affairs, the others were the governors of Michigan, Florida, and Arkansas territories; Clark had by far the largest superintendency.

Though Clark tried to maintain peaceful relations with indigenous nations and negotiated peace treaties, he was in charge of implementing President Andrew Jackson's Indian removal policy. He managed retaliation against Black Hawk and those allied with him in the Black Hawk War, when hostilities arose between them and the Americans. Clark issued "an extermination order", which he gave to Lewis Cass, a man who played a central role in Jackson's removal policy.

Clark believed in the Jeffersonian ideology in which assimilation would be the best course of action for Native Americans. However, in the end, relocation of the Indians from their native lands became the government's primary goal, and even the assimilated Five Civilized Tribes were moved by force (threat of military action). Clark's government position on Native American affairs kept him at the forefront of countless relocations. He expressed sympathy for those uprooted tribes and promoted their interests as he understood them, nevertheless, he agreed with and implemented the policy of Indian removal, negotiating 37, or one-tenth, of all ratified treaties between Native Americans and the United States. Over the course of his career, millions of acres passed from Indian to U.S. ownership through Clark's hand.

== Later life and death ==
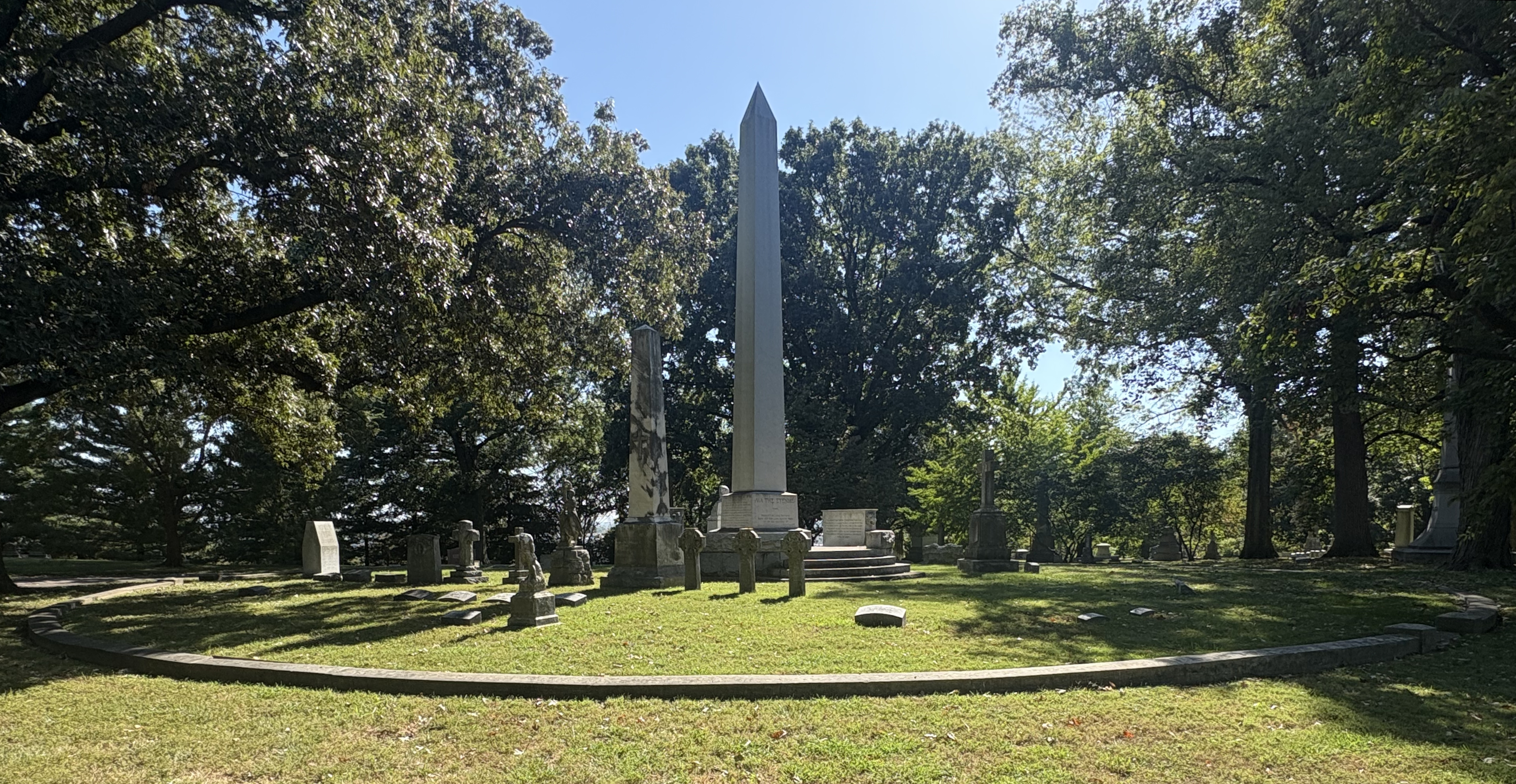
Clark family plot at Bellefontaine Cemetery

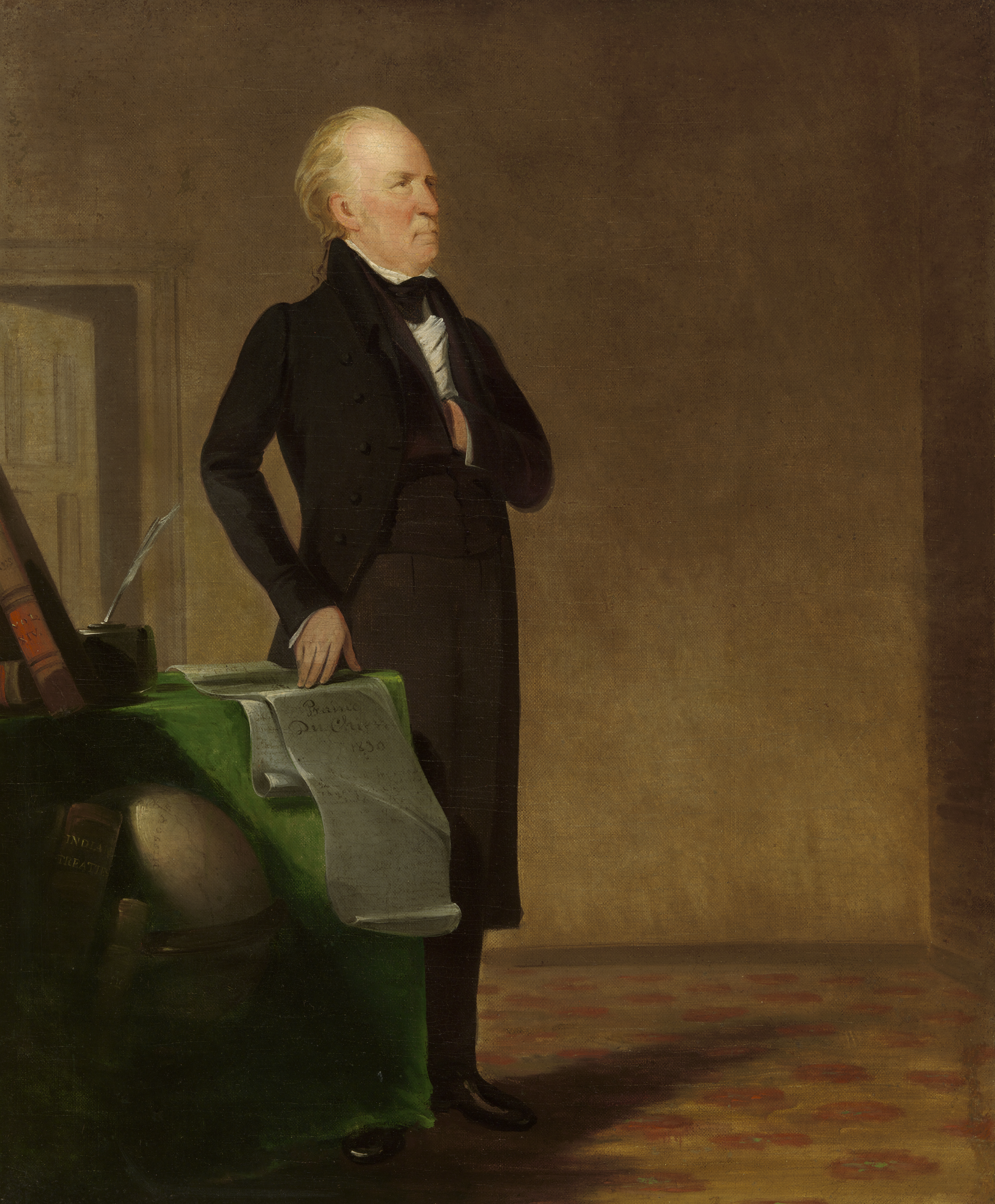
Portrait by George Catlin, c. 1832

William Clark died in St. Louis on September 1, 1838, at age 68. Clark was originally buried at his nephew John O'Fallon's property, in 1838. That area is now known as O'Fallon Park. The funeral procession stretched for more than a mile and cannons fired a military salute. The entire city of St. Louis mourned his death.

Clark and six of his family members were later buried at Bellefontaine Cemetery on October 23, 1860. The monument that marks their graves, a 35-foot (11 m) gray granite obelisk, was dedicated in 1904 on the centennial anniversary of the Louisiana Purchase. Clark's son, Jefferson Kearney Clark, designed the monument and paid $25,000 for it ($425,000 in 2005 figures). Jefferson Clark's wife had to complete the building of the monument after Jefferson died in 1900. Many years later, the monument was restored and rededicated on May 21, 2004, to mark the bicentennial of the Corps of Discovery's departure from St. Charles, Missouri. Members of the Shoshone, Osage, and Mandan tribes spoke at the ceremony, marking Clark's service to these Indian nations during the final years of his life.

== Marriage and family ==
After returning from his cross-country expedition, Clark married Julia Hancock on January 5, 1808, at Fincastle, Virginia. They had five children: Meriwether Lewis Clark, Sr. (1809–1881), named after his friend and expedition partner; William Preston Clark (1811–1840); Mary Margaret Clark (1814–1821); George Rogers Hancock Clark (1816–1858), named after Clark's older brother; and John Julius Clark (1818–1831), named after his oldest brother Jonathan and Clark's wife.

After Julia's death in 1820, William Clark married Julia's first cousin, Harriet Kennerly Radford. They had three children together: Jefferson Kearny Clark (1824–1900), named after the president; Edmund Clark (1826–1827), named after another of his older brothers; and Harriet Clark, named after her mother (dates unknown; died as child). His second wife Harriet died in 1831.

Clark allegedly had a Nez Perce son, Tzi-Kal-Tza/Halahtookit. Clark also served as a guardian to Jean Baptiste Charbonneau, the son of Sacagawea and Toussaint Charbonneau.

Clark was a habitually cruel enslaver. Clark regularly whipped the people he enslaved, bragging about it in letters to his brother. Those beaten included York, his long time body servant who was taken on the expedition. He continued enslaving people until his death, leaving some enslaved persons to his children in his will.

== Legacy ==
=== Honors ===
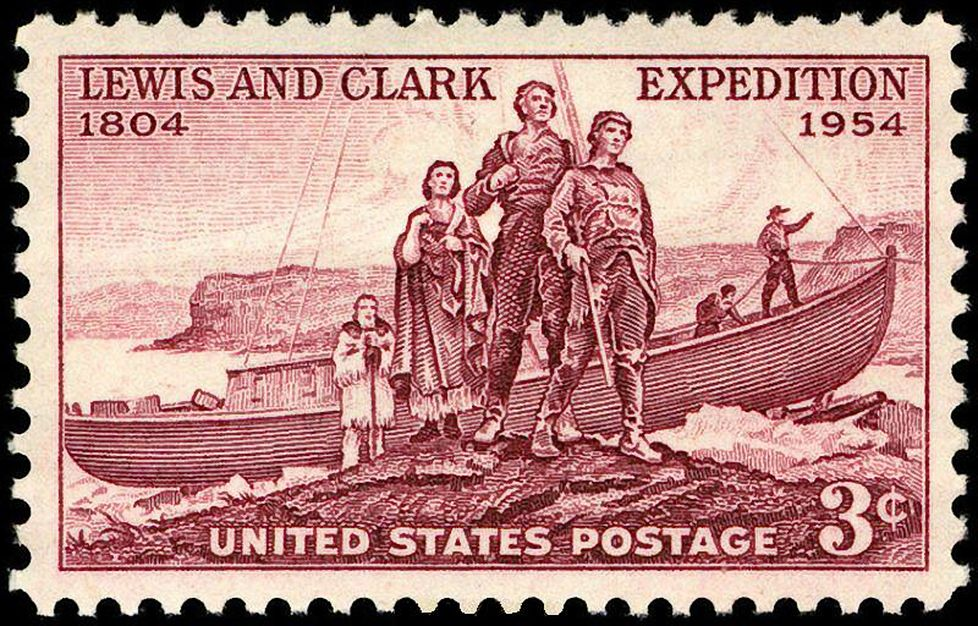
Lewis and Clark, 1954 issue

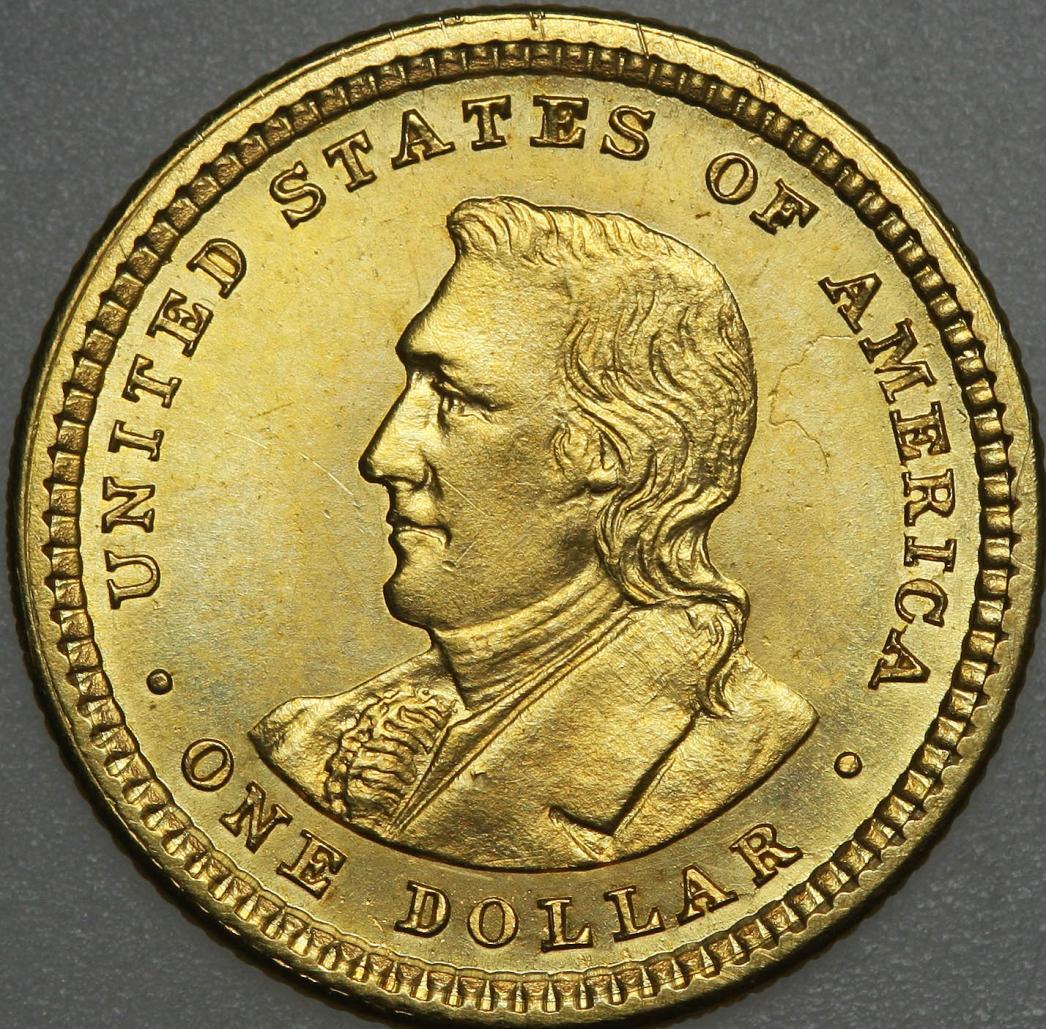
Clark depicted on the 1904–05 commemorative Lewis and Clark Exposition dollar

- Clark was elected a member of the American Antiquarian Society in 1814.
- Both Lewis and Clark appear on the gold Lewis and Clark Exposition dollars minted for the Lewis and Clark Centennial Exposition. Among the early United States commemorative coins, they were produced in both 1904 and 1905 and survive in relatively small numbers.
- Meriwether Lewis and William Clark were honored with a 3-cent stamp July 24, 1954, on the 150th anniversary of their expedition.
- In 1965, Clark was inducted into the Hall of Great Westerners of the National Cowboy & Western Heritage Museum.
- In 1996, Clark was inducted to the St. Louis Walk of Fame.
- In 2001, President Bill Clinton promoted Clark to the rank of captain in the US Army posthumously. Descendants of Clark were there to mark the occasion.
- Celebrations took place on the bicentennial of the Lewis and Clark expedition. On May 14, 2004, the 200th anniversary of its outset, two companion 37-cent stamps were issued showing portraits of Meriwether Lewis and William Clark. A special 32-page booklet accompanied the issue in eleven cities along the route taken by the Corps of Discovery. On May 21, 2004, there was a rededication ceremony of the obelisk at Clark's grave site. Although his family had established endowments to maintain his grave site, by the late 20th century, the grave site had fallen into disrepair. His descendants raised $100,000 to rehabilitate the obelisk. The ceremony was attended by a large gathering of Clark's descendants, reenactors in period dress, and leaders from the Osage Nation and the Lemhi band of the Shoshone.

=== Eponyms ===
- The western American plant genus Clarkia (in the evening primrose family Onagraceae), is named after him, as are the cutthroat trout (Oncorhynchus clarki), and Clark's nutcracker (Nucifraga columbiana), a large passerine bird, in the family Corvidae. All were species which Clark identified during the expedition.
- There are counties named in his honor in six states: Arkansas, Idaho, Kentucky, Missouri, Montana, and Washington.
- The city of Clarkston, Washington is named for him.
- Natural features named for Clark include the Clarks River in western Kentucky, as well as the Clark Fork in Montana and Idaho, the Clarks Fork Yellowstone River in Montana and Wyoming, and Clark's Mountain in Oregon.
- Two U.S. Navy Vessels have been named in honor of Clark; the Polaris nuclear submarine USS Lewis and Clark and the supply ship USNS Lewis and Clark were named for him and Lewis.
- The Clark Bridge, a cable-stayed bridge across the Mississippi River between West Alton, Missouri and Alton, Illinois, was named after him.
- Several higher education institutions are named for the explorers, including Lewis and Clark Community College in the Metro East region of Illinois, Lewis and Clark Law School and Lewis & Clark College in Portland, Oregon, and Lewis-Clark State College in Lewiston, Idaho.

== General references ==
- Buckley, Jay H. William Clark: Indian Diplomat. Norman: University of Oklahoma Press, 2008. ISBN 978-0-8061-3911-1.
- Foley, William E. Wilderness Journey: The Life of William Clark. Columbia: University of Missouri Press, 2004. ISBN 0-8262-1533-5.
- Jones, Landon Y. William Clark and the Shaping of the West, New York: Hill and Wang, 2004. ISBN 0-8090-9726-5.

Political offices
Preceded by Benjamin Howard	Governor of Missouri Territory; 1813–1820	Succeeded by Alexander McNair (statehood)
