= Strathy Hall =

Historic house in Georgia, United States

- U.S. National Register of Historic Places
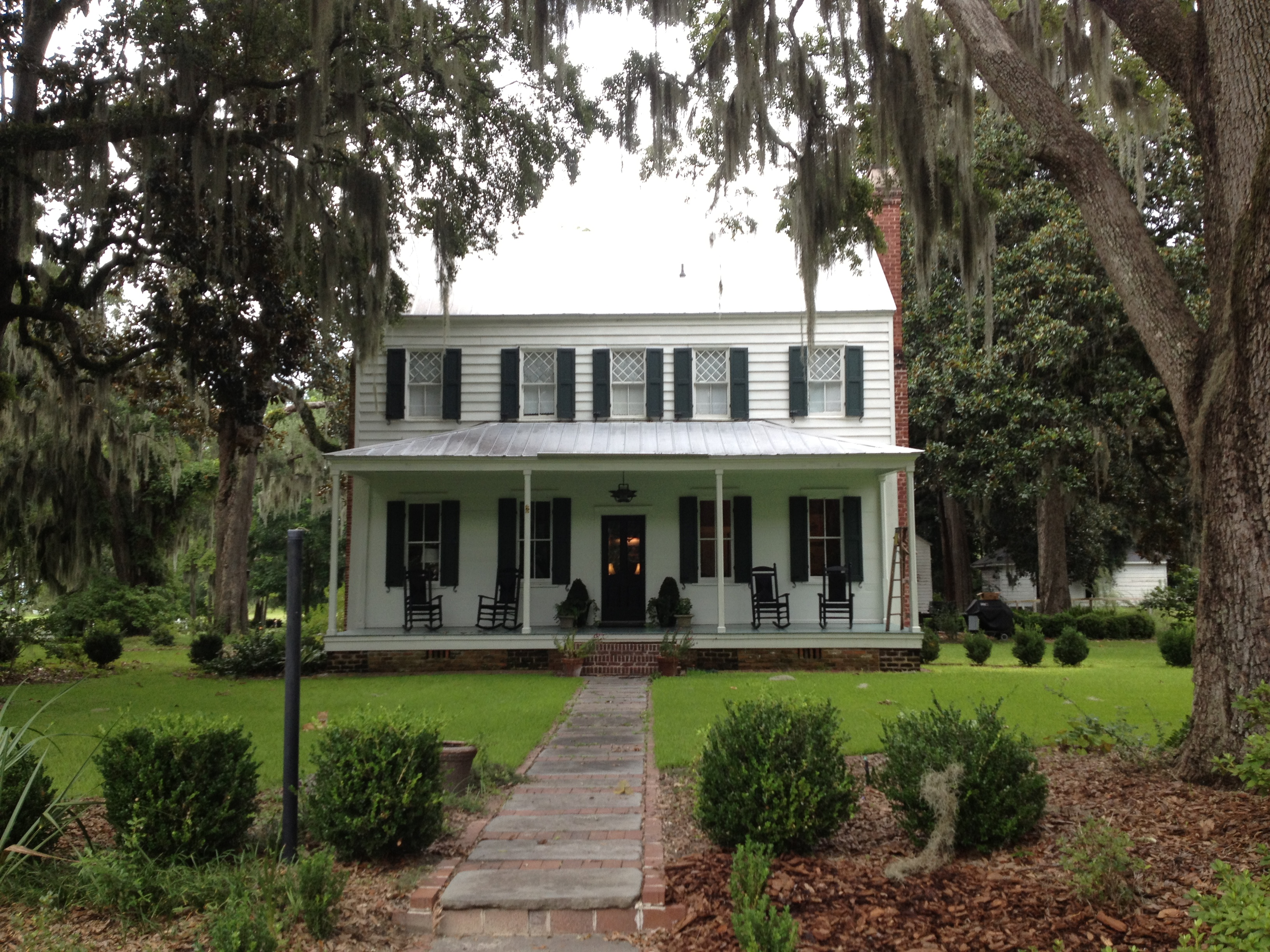

- Location within Georgia Location within the United States
- Location: Bryan County, Georgia, USA
- Nearest city: Richmond Hill, Georgia
- Coordinates: 31.9047°N 81.2513°W
- Area: 3.637 acres (1.472 ha)
- Built: c. 1840
- Architectural style: Plantation Plain
- NRHP reference No.: 79000701
- Added to NRHP: January 29, 1979

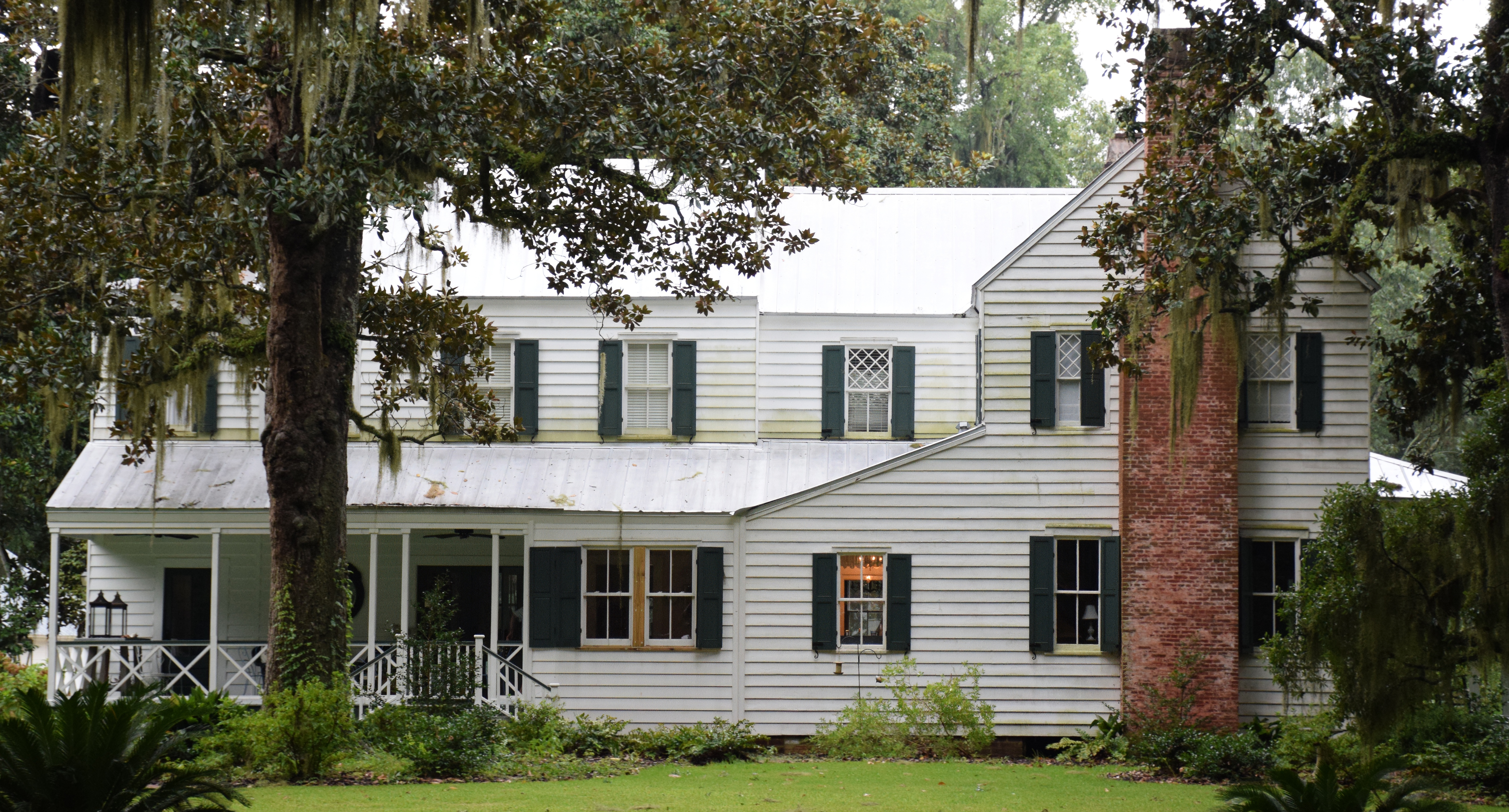
Side view

Strathy Hall is an antebellum plantation house located near Richmond Hill in Bryan County, Georgia. It was originally constructed in 1756 by James Mackay, a Scottish captain serving alongside George Washington under General Oglethorpe defending the southern border from the Spanish. In the early 1800s the house was damaged in a fire and by circa 1840 by George W. McAllister restored the house on its original foundation, the paternal uncle of Archibald McAllister, who owned Strathy Hall Plantation, a large rice plantation on the Ogeechee River.

Based on photographs, the house was much larger in the early 20th century, due to additions and alterations. Henry Ford removed the additions when he bought the property in the 1920s. The house is raised slightly on brick piers. The inside walls are plastered and have a concave moulding. The floors are made of pine. The home is currently owned and cared for by the Appleton Family.

== See also ==
- Wild Heron: rice plantation house in Chatham County
- National Register of Historic Places listings in Bryan County, Georgia
