= Wild Heron =

Historic house in Georgia, United States

- U.S. National Register of Historic Places
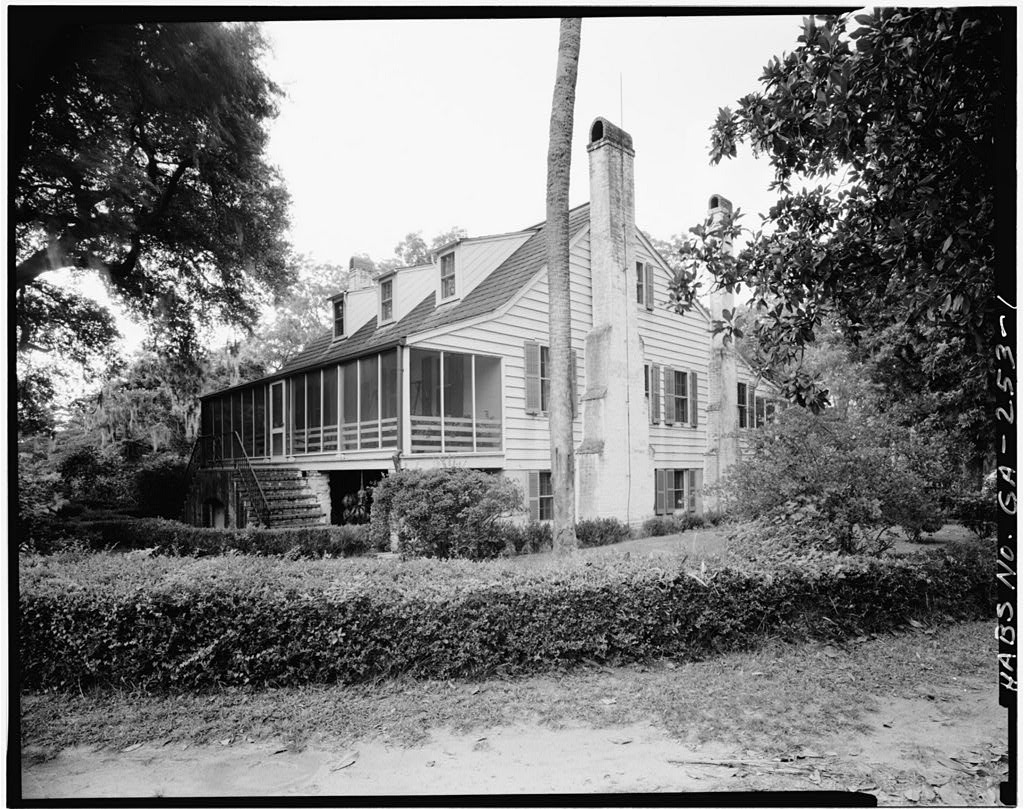

- Location within Georgia Location within the United States
- Nearest city: Savannah, Georgia
- Coordinates: 31°58′14″N 81°13′8″W
- Area: 6 acres (2.4 ha)
- Built: ca. 1754
- Architectural style: Raised Cottage
- NRHP reference No.: 77000415
- Added to NRHP: December 16, 1977

Wild Heron is a historic plantation house approximately 15 miles (24 km) south of Savannah, Georgia. It is one of the oldest domestic structures in Georgia and is a relatively intact example of a typical architectural genre which flourished in coastal Georgia and South Carolina in the eighteenth century. Adding to its significance is its association with Francis Henry Harris (1710–1771) and his son, Col. Francis Henry Harris (1740–1782), prominent figures of the Colonial and Revolutionary eras in Georgia, and the operation through two hundred years as a working rice plantation, owned for much of that time by descendants of the same family.

The house was built on a 500-acre (200 ha) tract of land granted to Captain David Cutler Braddock in 1747. Braddock, "allowed to be an excellent seaman, according to the loyal Governor's Council President, James Habersham in 1750", most likely constructed the house between 1752 and 1756 when Braddock was loaned a large sum of money by Francis Harris. The wainscoting, chimneys, and mantels along with its double spraddle roof are all suggestive of an eighteenth-century construction date.

Francis Harris, an English-born accountant, came to Georgia about 1739 to assist Thomas Causton with the trustee accounts. In 1744, Harris became a partner with James Habersham in the commercial firm of Harris and Habersham. Harris was a member of the Royal Governor's Council and the first Speaker of the House of Commons in colonial Georgia. He was married in England about 1754, and tradition holds that his wife, Mary Goodall, was heiress to an estate in Hampshire, England known as Wild Heron, which she sold about the time of her marriage and move to Savannah. Harris abandoned the mercantile trade and became a planter acquiring land on the Little Ogeechee River. He paid 1168 pounds for Braddock's tract, the high price indicating the presence of a house on the property, and the English name was transferred to the American land. The name was contracted, English fashion, to Wild Hern, a name that evolved to Wild Horn; the property was known by that name until research in 1935 discovered the original name of the plantation to be Wild Heron.

Having been granted 1,300 acres (530 ha) in 1762 and purchased another 1,600 acres (650 ha) in the same vicinity, Harris had accrued considerable holdings by 1769. After his death in 1771, his son, Col. Francis Henry Harris, inherited the property. Col. Harris fought in the Revolutionary War until 1781, when he was wounded at Etttaw Springs, dying shortly thereafter at Santee Hills. His sister, Elizabeth Harris MacLeod, inherited the property which passed, in turn, to her son, Francis Henry MacLeod. MacLeod managed the plantation until his death in 1866. He left a large estate was valued at approximately $264,000, including 450 acres (180 ha) planted in rice, 310 acres (130 ha) of rice fields unplanted, 2,000 acres (810 ha) of high lands, 1,000 acres (400 ha) of marshland, and 129 slaves. The slaves and MacLeod's Confederate bonds and notes were of no value, but were included in the appraisal of his estate.

The Ogeechee River District in which Wild Heron was located, was an extension of the great rice planting corridor of the Savannah River. In addition, the extensive high land acreage allowed for the growing of the South's king crop, cotton. When MacLeod died just before the collapse of the Confederacy the so-called "Settlement Tract," on which the house was located, was a legacy to his son, Richard, who, followed by his descendants, owned it through the difficult intervening years until Shelby Myrick, Sr., purchased it in 1935. The Myrick family accomplished a careful restoration of the house, which retains its eighteenth-century character as well as its structure.

Wild Heron was added to the National Register of Historic Places in 1977. It is the oldest plantation house in Savannah and one of the oldest houses in Georgia.

== See also ==
- List of the oldest buildings in Georgia
- Strathy Hall: rice plantation house in Bryan County
- National Register of Historic Places listings in Chatham County, Georgia
