= Archibald McAllister =

American politician

Archibald McAllister (October 12, 1813 – July 18, 1883) was a Democratic member of the U.S. House of Representatives from Pennsylvania.

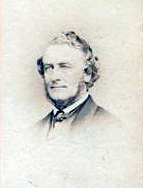
Archibald McAllister

== Early life and education ==
Archibald McAllister (grandson of John Andre Hanna, and the paternal nephew of George Washington McAllister, the owner of Strathy Hall) was born at Fort Hunter, Pennsylvania, near present-day Harrisburg, Pennsylvania. He attended the common schools and Dickinson College in Carlisle, Pennsylvania. He moved to Blair County, Pennsylvania, in 1842 and engaged in manufacturing charcoal iron at Springfield Furnace, Pennsylvania.

== Career ==
McAllister was elected as a Democrat to the Thirty-eighth Congress. Although he was a Democrat, he supported the passage of the Thirteenth Amendment. During the congressional debate, McAllister justified his new stance because he saw destroying "the corner-stone of the Southern Confederacy" as the only path to peace. He was not a candidate for renomination in 1864.

== Later life and death ==
He resumed the manufacture of iron and died in Royer, Pennsylvania. He is interred in Mountain Cemetery.

== Sources ==
- United States Congress. "Archibald McAllister (id: M000295)". Biographical Directory of the United States Congress.
- The Political Graveyard

U.S. House of Representatives
Preceded by Edward McPherson	Member of the U.S. House of Representatives from Pennsylvania's 17th congressional district 1863–1865	Succeeded by Abraham A. Barker
