= National Register of Historic Places listings in Bryan County, Georgia =

Map of Georgia with Bryan County highlighted

This is a list of properties and districts in Bryan County, Georgia that are listed on the National Register of Historic Places (NRHP).

This National Park Service list is complete through NPS recent listings posted December 12, 2025.

== Current listings ==
	Name on the Register	Image	Date listed	Location	City or town	Description
1	Bryan County Courthouse	Bryan County Courthouse	June 14, 1995 (#95000713)	College St. 32°08′00″N 81°37′17″W	Pembroke	
2	Bryan Neck Presbyterian Church	Bryan Neck Presbyterian Church	March 15, 2000 (#00000193)	Belfast Keller Rd. 31°50′30″N 81°15′40″W	Keller	
3	Community House	Community House	August 28, 2024 (#100010792)	10512 Ford Avenue; 31°56′30″N 81°18′23″W	Richmond Hill	
4	Fort McAllister	Fort McAllister	May 13, 1970 (#70000197)	10 mi. E of Richmond Hill via GA 67; 31°53′30″N 81°11′42″W	Richmond Hill	Now a Georgia state historic site website
5	Glen Echo	Glen Echo	January 9, 1978 (#78000965)	2 miles (3 km) east of Ellabelle on GA 204; 32°08′07″N 81°27′53″W	Ellabelle	
6	Kilkenny	Kilkenny	February 14, 1979 (#79000700)	E of Richmond Hill on Kilkenny Rd. 31°47′24″N 81°12′12″W	Richmond Hill	
7	Old Fort Argyle Site	Old Fort Argyle Site	March 31, 1975 (#75000574)	Address Restricted (on the west bank of the Ogeechee River in Fort Stewart)	Savannah	
8	Pembroke Historic District	Pembroke Historic District	December 8, 2004 (#04001318)	Centered on US 280 and Main St. 32°08′09″N 81°37′24″W	Pembroke	
9	Richmond Hill Plantation	Richmond Hill Plantation	January 30, 1978 (#78000966)	E of Richmond Hill on Ford Neck Rd. 31°55′33″N 81°16′35″W	Richmond Hill	On private property (gated)
10	Seven Mile Bend	Seven Mile Bend	April 11, 1972 (#72000373)	Address Restricted	Richmond Hill	Facebook page
11	Strathy Hall	Strathy Hall	January 21, 1979 (#79000701)	SE of Richmond Hill; 31°54′17″N 81°15′05″W	Richmond Hill	
