= Kilkenny Creek =

Coordinates: 31°46′25.79″N 81°10′25.37″W

Kilkenny Creek, sometimes referred to as the Kilkenny River, is located at Savannah River Ent. in the vicinity of the Kilkenny Plantation in Georgia, United States. It is home to the Kilkenny Marina.
