= Glen Echo (Ellabell, Georgia) =

Historic house in Georgia, United States

- U.S. National Register of Historic Places
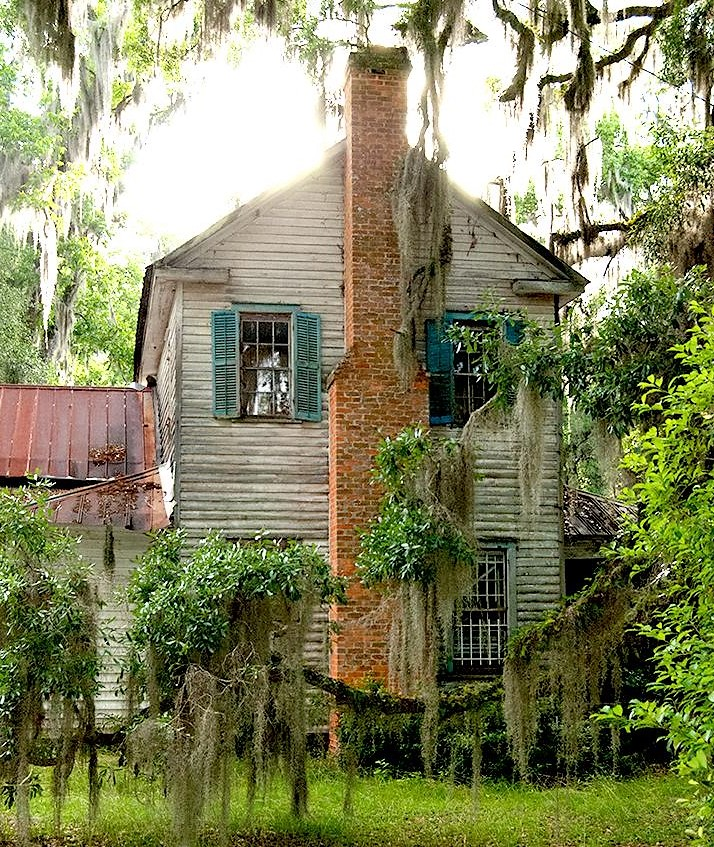
- House at Glen Echo

- Location within Georgia Location within the United States
- Nearest city: Ellabell, Georgia
- Coordinates: 32°08′07″N 81°27′51″W
- Area: 7 acres (2.8 ha)
- Built: 1773
- Architectural style: Plantation Plain
- NRHP reference No.: 78000965
- Added to NRHP: January 9, 1978

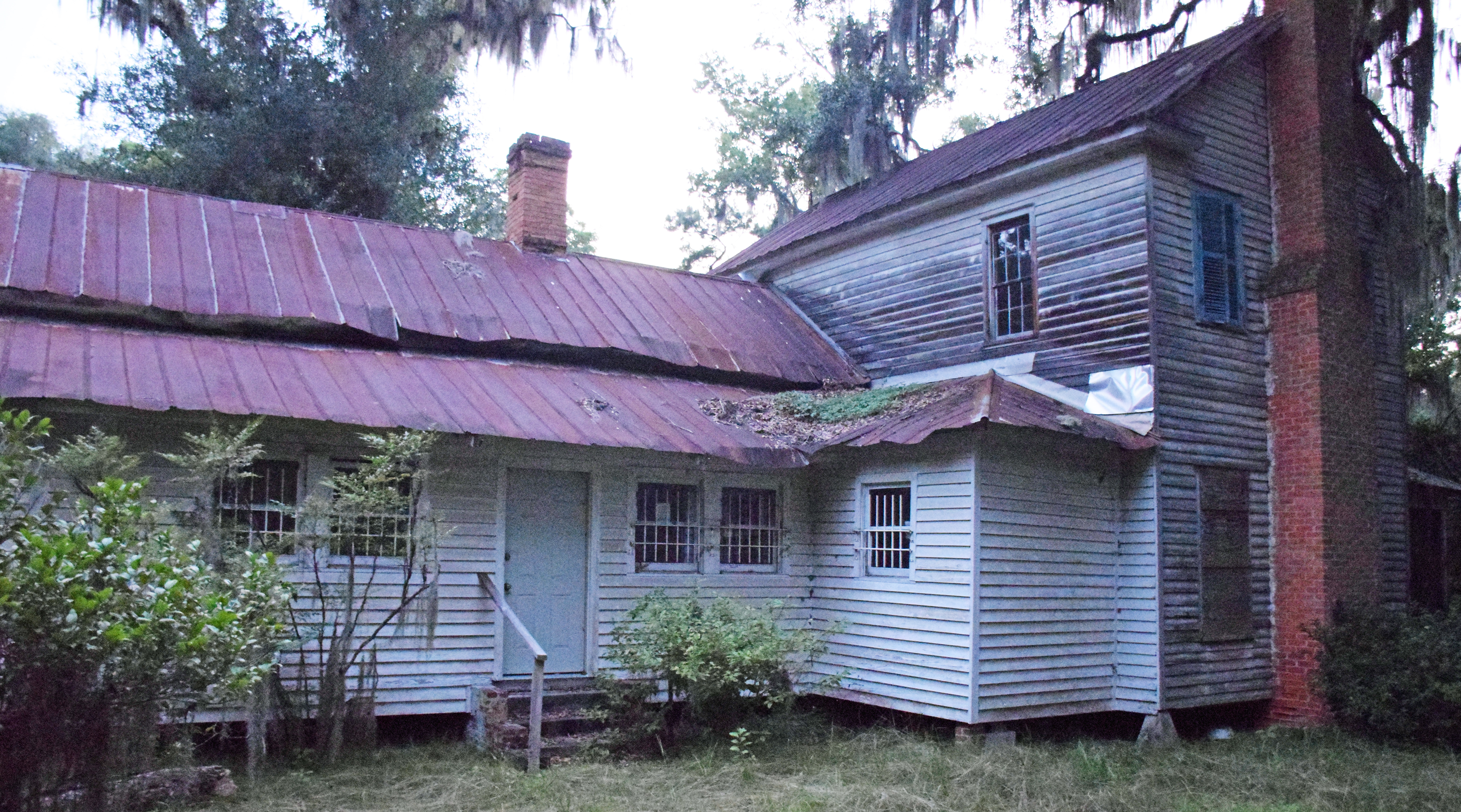
Side of house

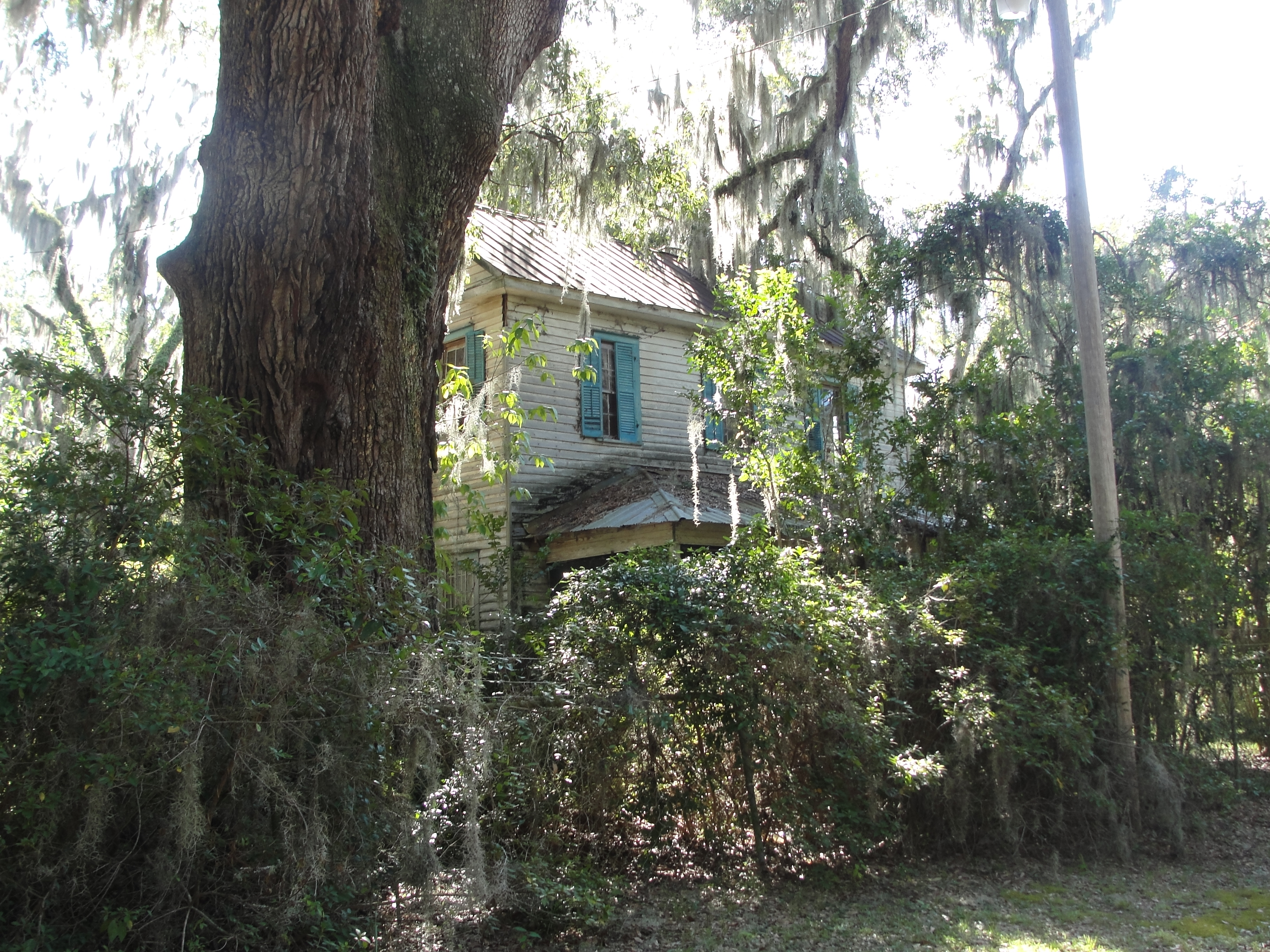
Front of house

Glen Echo is a historic plantation house near Ellabell, Georgia, United States. The house was built circa 1773 and is an early example of Plantation Plain style. Records show that the land of Glen Echo Plantation was granted in the colonial era through a king's grant to a member of the Bird family. It was placed on the National Register of Historic Places in 1978.

== See also ==
- National Register of Historic Places listings in Bryan County, Georgia
