= Fort Argyle =

Historic fort in Georgia, US

- Old Fort Argyle Site
- U.S. National Register of Historic Places
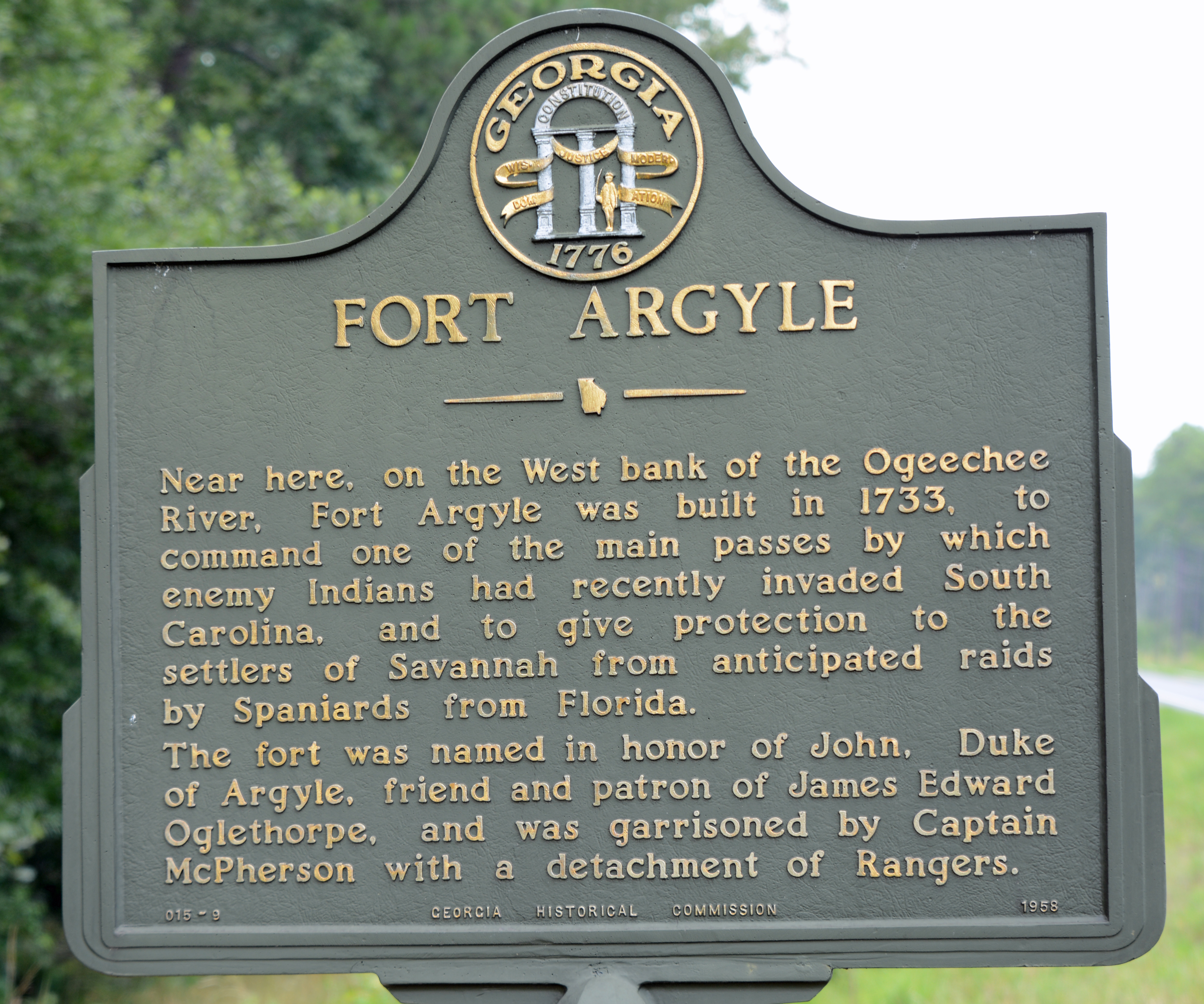
- Historical marker some distance from the site
- Nearest city: Savannah, Georgia
- Area: 20 acres (8.1 ha)
- Built: 1734
- NRHP reference No.: 75000574
- Added to NRHP: March 31, 1975

Old Fort Argyle Site is a historic site near Savannah. It is in Fort Stewart in Bryan County, Georgia. It was an English military settlement. It was added to the National Register of Historic Places on March 31, 1975. Access is restricted.

There were actually three forts near this location - the first being constructed in 1734, a second around 1742, and a third in the late 1750s.

There is a historical marker nearby, which reads:

Fort Argyle

Near here, on the West bank of the Ogeechee River, Fort Argyle was built in 1733, to command one of the main passes by which enemy Indians had recently invaded South Carolina, and to give protection to the settlers of Savannah from anticipated raid by Spaniards from Florida.

The fort was named in honor of John, Duke of Argyle, friend and patron of James Edward Oglethorpe, and was garrisoned by Captain McPherson with a detachment of Rangers.

GHM 015-9 GEORGIA HISTORICAL COMMISSION 1958

The marker is located on GA 144, 4 miles west of junction with US 17 (at N31° 58.362', W81° 22.602').

Ten families initially settled in the fort's neighborhood, and it was General James Oglethorpe's plan to develop a town here; however, when the garrison was withdrawn, eight of the ten families moved away, with the remaining two soon following.

== See also ==
- Fort Frederica National Monument
- National Register of Historic Places listings in Bryan County, Georgia
