= Jonathan Clark (soldier) =

American soldier (1750–1811)

- Born: August 1, 1750; Albemarle County, Colony of Virginia, British America
- Died: November 25, 1811 (aged 61); Louisville, Kentucky, U.S.
- Occupation: Soldier
- Spouse: Sarah Hite (m. 1782)
- Relatives: George Rogers Clark (brother); William Clark (brother)
- Military career
- Allegiance: United States
- Branch: Continental Army
- Rank: Major-general
- Unit: 8th Virginia Regiment
- Conflicts: American Revolutionary War; Battle of Brandywine; Battle of Germantown; Battle of Monmouth

Jonathan Clark (August 1, 1750 – November 25, 1811) was an American soldier. After serving as captain, major and colonel in the American Revolutionary War, he rose to the rank of major-general. He was the older brother of fellow soldiers General George Rogers Clark and Captain William Clark of the Lewis and Clark Expedition.

== Early life and education ==
Clark was the oldest brother of the children of John Clark and Ann Rogers, was born in Albemarle County, Virginia on August 1, 1750. He received a fair English education, and, in time, became a lawyer, and a successful man of business. He was the prudent, practical businessman of the elder portion of the numerous children of John Clark, as his brother William was of the younger. When quite young he spent some time in the office of the clerk of Spotsylvania County, Virginia, as deputy clerk.

In 1772 he removed to Woodstock, in the county then called Dunmore, but which was afterwards changed to Shenandoah, and was very soon taken into public favor by being selected, with the celebrated Peter Muhlenberg, to serve as delegate from the county in an important convention held at Richmond in the interests of the colonies.

About this time trouble began between the citizens of Virginia, and the royal governor, Lord Dunmore, which culminated in the latter seizing the public powder belonging to the colony without authority. This led to an uprising of the colonists to regain possession of the powder, by force if necessary, and young Clark marched towards Williamsburg, the then capital, as lieutenant of an independent company of riflemen for that purpose.

Clark's company returned home, however, without bloodshed, and he and Muhlenberg were again sent as delegates to the convention which met at Richmond in December, 1775.

In the spring of 1776, Clark was promoted to the captaincy of a company (commissioned March 4), which advanced from Woodstock to Portsmouth, and was engaged in several skirmishes with the adherents of the royal governor, Dunmore, who, in the meantime, had fled the capital and taken refuge on an English ship.

Early in the following summer, Clark marched with Muhlenberg's regiment and other troops to Charleston, South Carolina, at which place they arrived on the 24th of June, and were at once involved in the important military movements then going on at that place and vicinity. He continued there until in August when he was ordered further south, and at Savannah was seized with dangerous illness which so prostrated him that, for a long time, he was unable to perform military service, and returned home on furlough in the autumn of that year. When about recovered from this long protracted sickness in the spring of 1777, he had the misfortune to be taken down with the smallpox, which again disabled him for a considerable period.

As soon as his health permitted, he returned to the army under Washington, then at Bound Brook encampment, and with the 8th Virginia Regiment, in the brigade of General Charles Scott, participated in the battles of Brandywine and Germantown, and aided in breaking the British right wing in the latter battle.

He was also in the Battle of Monmouth in 1778, and in 1779 served with great distinction in the surprise of the enemy at Paulus Hook, on which important occasion he was second in command, having been previously promoted to be a major by congress.

One hundred and fifty-nine of the enemy were captured in this affair, with a loss to the Americans of only two killed and three wounded. So important was the result that General Washington hastened to communicate it to Congress in a manner highly complimentary. He said, "that a remarkable degree of prudence, address, enterprise and bravery was displayed on the occasion, which does the highest honor to all the officers and men engaged in it, and that the situation of the fort rendered the attempt critical and the success brilliant." Congress returned thanks and ordered a gold medal to be made in honor of the event, and fifteen thousand dollars to be distributed among the rank and file who participated in the enterprise.

Major Clark was highly complimented in letters from Lord Sterling and other officers, and in November following congress promoted him to be a lieutenant-colonel, to date from the previous May.

In the following winter Clark and the Virginia regiment to which he belonged, together with other troops, marched through terrible hardships to the south, reaching the Siege of Charleston in the last of March, 1780, where they encountered still further trials and sufferings, until finally, on the 12th of May, the American army, then under command of General Benjamin Lincoln, was compelled to surrender to the enemy. Colonel Clark was held a prisoner in Charleston until the spring of 1781, when he was paroled and returned to Virginia, but he was not formally exchanged until after the surrender of Lord Cornwallis.

Abraham Bowman was the colonel of the 8th Virginia Regiment of which Clark was the lieutenant-colonel, and he was also the first cousin of an attractive young lady residing in Frederick County, Virginia, named Sarah Hite. She was the daughter of Isaac Hite Sr., and granddaughter of Jost Hite, and her brother Isaac Hite Jr., was likewise a major in the Revolutionary army.

The friendship existing between the two comrades-in-arms led to an acquaintance between Colonel Clark and Miss Hite, which resulted in their marriage February 13, 1782. He settled for a time in Spotsylvania County, and was commissioned a major-general of the Virginia militia in 1793.

But his thoughts now turned to the great west, and in 1802 he joined his distinguished brother, General George Rogers Clark at the falls of the Ohio, settling finally at Trough Spring, near Louisville, Kentucky. Here he devoted himself to business with great success, accumulating a large fortune in real estate as well as personal property. The inventory of the latter, returned by Abraham Hite, his wife's cousin, and John H. Clark, his son, his administrators, covers eleven pages of book of inventories No. 2, Jefferson County, Kentucky. A glance over the long list shows that fifty-six of his slaves were mentioned by name. The following notice of General Jonathan Clark's death appeared in the Western Sun, published at Vincennes, December 14, 1811: "Another Revolutionary hero is gone--Died at his seat near Louisville, Kentucky, on Monday, the 25th ult. (November, 1811), General Jonathan Clark--He supped with his family on the 24th, retired at his accustomed hour to rest, and in the morning was found numbered with the dead."

Sarah Hite was the younger by some eight years and survived him about that time. They are resting side by side in Cave Hill Cemetery.
