= Montgomery metropolitan area =

- Metropolitan Statistical Area
- Montgomery, Alabama; Metropolitan Statistical Area
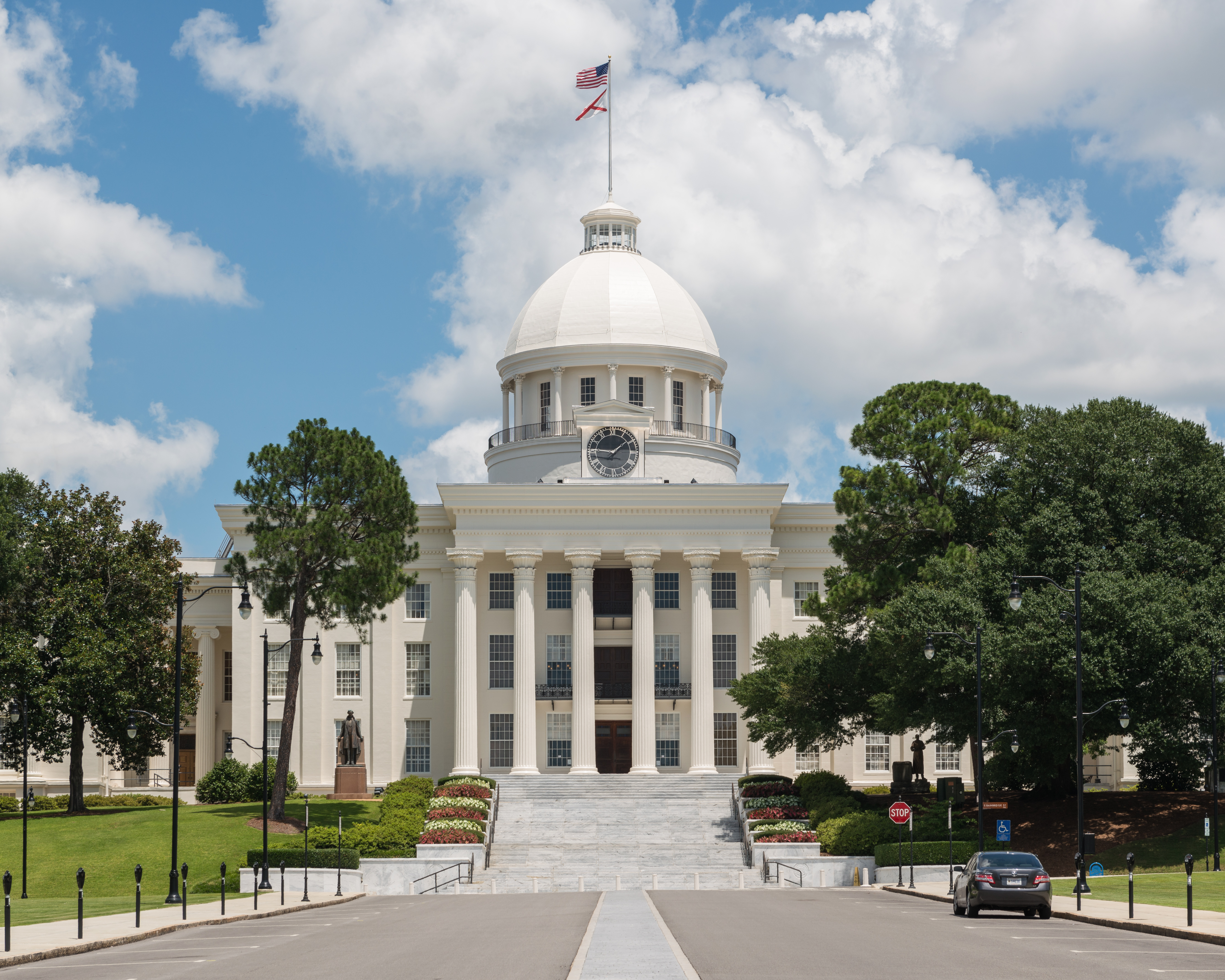
- The Alabama State Capitol in 2016
Interactive Map of Montgomery–Selma, AL CSA
City of Montgomery
Montgomery, AL MSA
Selma, AL MSA
- Coordinates: 32°21′42″N 86°16′45″W
- Country: United States
- State: Alabama
- Largest city: Montgomery
- Other cities: Prattville; Millbrook; Wetumpka; Selma

Area
  - Total: 2,786 sq mi (7,220 km^{2})

Population
  - Total: 386,047 (2,020)
  - Rank: 142nd in the U.S.
  - Density: 211.4/sq mi (81.63/km^{2})

GDP
  - Total: $22.080 billion (2022)
- Time zone: UTC−5 (CST)
  - Summer (DST): UTC−4 (CDT)

The Montgomery metropolitan area (commonly known as the Tri-Counties or the River Region) is a metropolitan area consisting of four counties in central Alabama. As of 2020, the MSA had a population of 386,047, ranking it 142nd among United States Metropolitan Statistical Areas. That number is up +3.07% from the 2010 census number of 374,536.

== Counties ==
- Autauga
- Elmore
- Lowndes
- Montgomery

== Communities ==
=== Places with more than 200,000 inhabitants ===
- Montgomery (Principal city)

=== Places with 10,000 to 35,000 inhabitants ===
- Millbrook
- Prattville
- Pike Road
- Selma

=== Places with 1,000 to 10,000 inhabitants ===
- Blue Ridge (census-designated place)
- Coosada
- Eclectic
- Fort Deposit
- Hayneville
- Mosses
- Tallassee (partial)
- Wetumpka
- White Hall
- Pine Level
- Redland
- Valley Grande
- Hope Hull
- Deatsville
- Holtville

=== Places with fewer than 1,000 inhabitants ===
- Autaugaville
- Benton
- Billingsley
- Elmore
- Gordonville
- Lowndesboro

=== Unincorporated places ===
- Booth
- Equality (part of Equality is in Elmore County)
- Letohatchee
- Davenport

== Demographics ==
As of the census of 2000, there were 346,528 people, 129,717 households, and 90,298 families residing within the MSA. The racial makeup of the MSA was 57.32% White, 40.27% African American, 0.31% Native American, 0.77% Asian, 0.03% Pacific Islander, 0.37% from other races, and 0.94% from two or more races. Hispanic or Latino of any race were 1.20% of the population.

The median income for a household in the MSA was $35,567, and the median income for a family was $42,304. Males had a median income of $31,881 versus $22,995 for females. The per capita income for the MSA was $16,996.

County	Seat	2025 estimate	2020 Census	Change	Area	Density
Montgomery	Montgomery	225,891	228,954	−1.34%	800 sq mi (2,100 km^{2})	282/sq mi (109/km^{2})
Elmore	Wetumpka	91,577	87,977	+4.09%	657 sq mi (1,700 km^{2})	139/sq mi (54/km^{2})
Autauga	Prattville	61,920	58,805	+5.30%	604 sq mi (1,560 km^{2})	103/sq mi (40/km^{2})
Lowndes	Hayneville	9,359	10,311	−9.23%	725 sq mi (1,880 km^{2})	13/sq mi (5/km^{2})
Total		388,747	386,047	+0.70%	2,786 sq mi (7,220 km^{2})	140/sq mi (54/km^{2})

== Combined Statistical Area ==
The original Montgomery–Alexander City Combined Statistical Area (CSA) was made up of six counties in central Alabama. The statistical area included the Montgomery Metropolitan Statistical area and the former Alexander City Micropolitan Statistical Area, composed of Coosa and Tallapoosa Counties. As of the 2000 Census, the CSA had a population of 400,205 (though a July 1, 2009 estimate placed the population at 417,965). In 2013, the United States Office of Management and Budget removed the Alexander City Micropolitan Statistical Area and Montgomery-Alexander City Combined Statistical Area from the list of metropolitan areas.

In September of 2018 the OMB reinstated Montgomery CSA. Officially named the Montgomery–Selma–Alexander City, AL CSA, it consisted of the 4 county Montgomery MSA, the Selma, AL (Dallas County) micropolitan area, and a re-added Alexander City (Coosa County and Tallapoosa County) micropolitan area. This seven-county area was, to date, the largest extent of the Montgomery area.

When the OMB revised its definitions in 2023, Alexander City was again removed from the CSA with Tallapoosa County added to the nearby Columbus–Auburn–Opelika combined statistical area and with Coosa County becoming part of the Talladega–Sylacauga Micropolitan Statistical Area.

The current CSA (Montgomery–Selma, AL CSA) consists of one metropolitan area and one micropolitan area, totaling five counties:

- Montgomery, AL Metropolitan Statistical Area
  - Autauga County
  - Elmore County
  - Lowndes County
  - Montgomery County
- Selma, AL Micropolitan Statistical Area
  - Dallas County

Statistical Area	2025 estimate	2020 Census	Change	Area	Density
Montgomery, AL Metropolitan Statistical Area	388,747	386,047	+0.70%	2,786 sq mi (7,220 km^{2})	140/sq mi (54/km^{2})
Selma, AL Micropolitan Statistical Area	35,140	38,462	−8.64%	994 sq mi (2,570 km^{2})	35/sq mi (14/km^{2})
Total	423,887	424,509	−0.15%	3,780 sq mi (9,800 km^{2})	112/sq mi (43/km^{2})

== Politics ==
Presidential election results
Year	DEM	GOP	Others
2016	47.4% 78,178	49.5% 81,560	3.1% 5,057
2012	49.8% 84,149	49.5% 83,720	0.7% 1,240
2008	48.2% 82,009	51.2% 87,020	0.5% 948
2004	42.0% 60,622	57.6% 83,135	0.5% 675
2000	44.3% 56,522	54.3% 69,235	1.4% 1,826
1996	44.7% 53,897	51.1% 61,599	4.1% 4,980
1992	40.8% 51,884	48.8% 62,141	10.4% 13,248
1988	39.3% 40,205	59.8% 61,216	0.9% 944
1984	39.1% 42,337	60.0% 65,001	0.8% 913
1980	42.7% 41,837	53.3% 52,249	4.0% 4,000
1976	47.8% 39,659	50.6% 42,044	1.6% 1,338
1972	26.1% 18,540	71.7% 50,968	2.2% 1,584
1968	23.8% 16,513	12.1% 8,387	64.1% 44,476
1964	–	78.0% 33,708	22.0% 9,515
1960	48.6% 14,981	49.6% 15,278	1.8% 555

For the first half of the 20th century, the Montgomery metropolitan area leaned towards the Democratic Party, as did the rest of the Solid South. It was one of the first regions in Alabama to flip towards the Republican Party, narrowly voting for Richard Nixon in 1960. With the one exception of George Wallace's third-party win in 1968, the Montgomery MSA would continue voting for Republicans, by varying margins, until Barack Obama's narrow victory there in 2012. No candidate has won the MSA by more than 3 percentage points in the most recent three presidential elections.

== Transportation ==
- Interstate 65
- Interstate 85
- U.S. Highway 31
- U.S. Highway 80
- U.S. Highway 82
- U.S. Highway 231
- U.S. Highway 331

== See also ==
- Table of United States Metropolitan Statistical Areas
- Table of United States Combined Statistical Areas
- Alabama census statistical areas
