= February 2022 North American winter storm =

North American winter storm in 2022

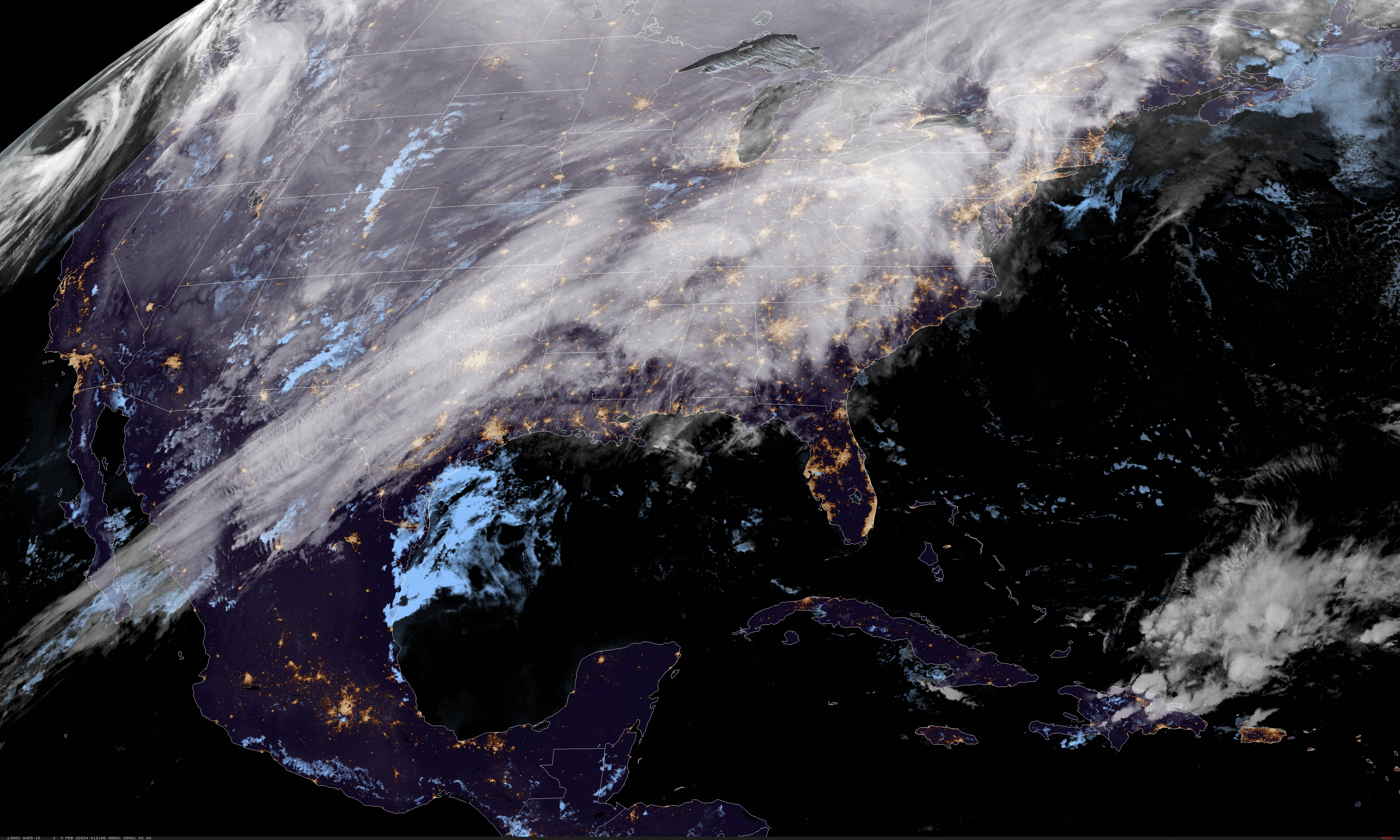
- Satellite image of the winter storm moving across the Central United States early on February 3

Meteorological history
- Formed: February 1, 2022
- Exited land: February 5, 2022
- Dissipated: February 9, 2022

Category 2 "Minor" winter storm
- Regional snowfall index: 5.48 (NOAA)
- Lowest pressure: 1004 mbar (hPa); 29.65 inHg
- Max. snowfall: Snow – 37 in (94 cm) at Taos Ski Valley, New Mexico; Sleet – 5.30 in (13.5 cm) in Eastport, Maine; Ice – 0.80 in (20 mm) in Lake Ariel, Pennsylvania

Tornado outbreak
- Tornadoes: 5
- Max. rating: EF2 tornado

Overall effects
- Fatalities: 8 total
- Damage: $350 million (2022 USD)
- Areas affected: Central, Southeastern, Northeastern, and Midwestern United States, Northern Mexico, Nova Scotia
- Power outages: >375,000
- Part of the 2021–22 North American winter

A widespread, damaging, and severe winter storm, unofficially named Winter Storm Landon by The Weather Channel, as well as the Groundhog Snowstorm, primarily due to the storm impacting on Groundhog Day; affected a wide swath of much of the United States with widespread wintry precipitation; it spread from Texas northeast to Maine in early February 2022. Nineteen states in the U.S. were impacted by the system; more than 90 million people were in the storm's path.

The storm spread a widespread swath of heavy snowfall stretching from Texas to Maine, with anywhere from 6–12 inches (15–30 cm) falling. It also caused many disruptions as well, with over 375,000 people losing power as a result of the storm and many accidents occurring on snowy roadways as well. 7 deaths were attributed to the winter storm's impacts. Five tornadoes also occurred within the warm sector of the storm in Alabama on February 3; three of them were rated EF2. Due to wintry conditions across Dallas, Texas, Dallas/Fort Worth International Airport was closed on February 3. 1 person and a dog were killed in Dallas, primarily when a semi-truck crashed while traveling on I-45 while traveling over I-30 Three inches of snow were reported in Nashville, Tennessee, as well as 2 additional inches in Little Rock, Arkansas and Mayfield, Kentucky. Over 120,000 people lost power in Shelby County, Tennessee. On I-10 near Kerrville, Texas, several semi-trucks were jackknifed, causing drivers to be stranded on the interstate for hours. A truck driver died on I-35 in Oklahoma after losing control on an icy part of the road. A person in Oklahoma died after crashing in an ATV on a snow-covered road. Ice impacts reached as far south as Corpus Christi, Texas.

== Meteorological history ==
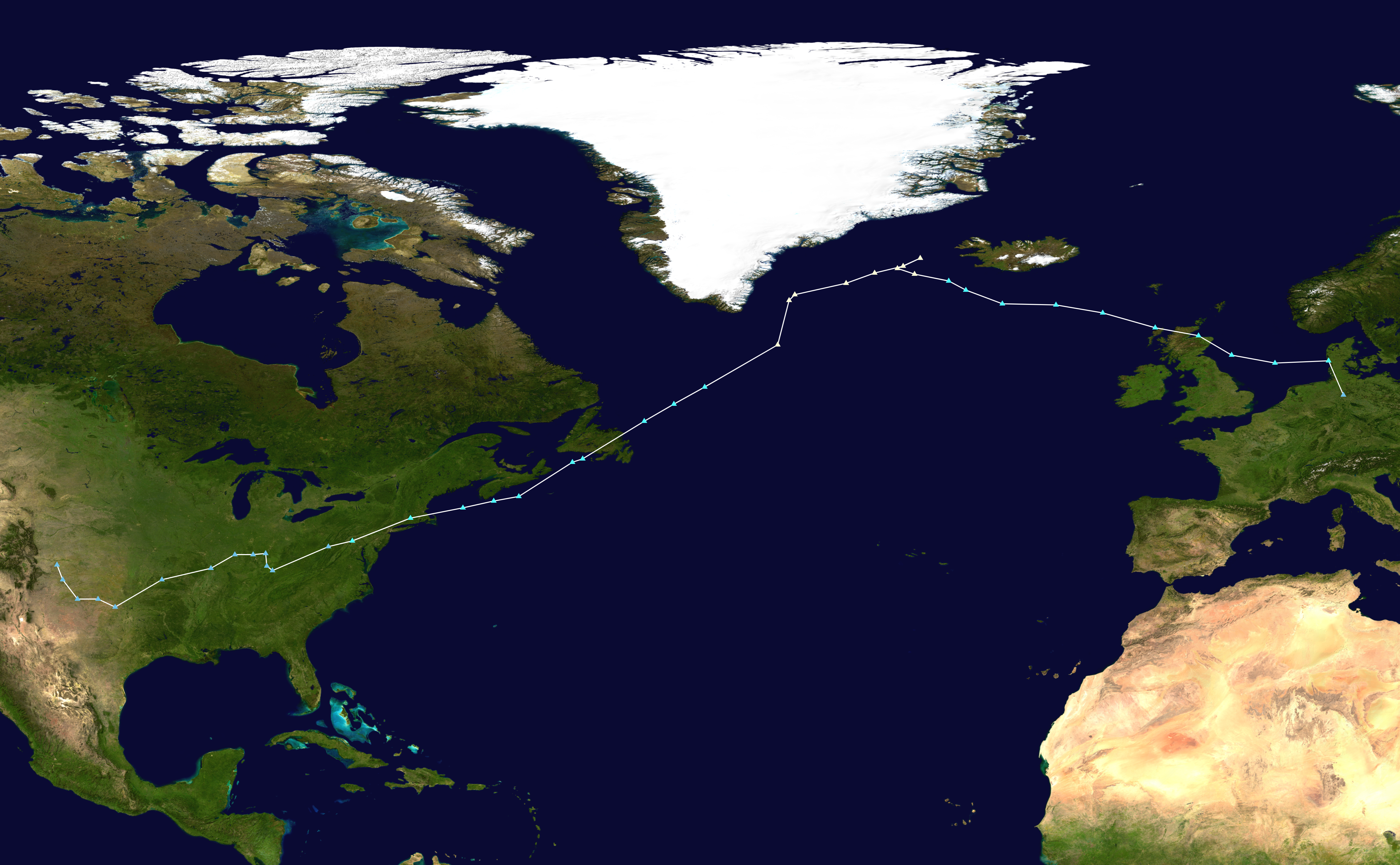
Map plotting the storm's track and intensity, according to the Saffir–Simpson scale Map key Saffir–Simpson scale Tropical depression (≤38 mph, ≤62 km/h) Tropical storm (39–73 mph, 63–118 km/h) Category 1 (74–95 mph, 119–153 km/h) Category 2 (96–110 mph, 154–177 km/h) Category 3 (111–129 mph, 178–208 km/h) Category 4 (130–156 mph, 209–251 km/h) Category 5 (≥157 mph, ≥252 km/h) Unknown Storm type Tropical cyclone Subtropical cyclone Extratropical cyclone, remnant low, tropical disturbance, or monsoon depression

Over much of the Midwest, temperatures were unseasonably mild on February 1 as a strong cold front moved southward over the region. Rain began to fall in the early afternoon over the Central Midwest, and temperatures began to drop as the front draped southward. During the early evening, an upper-level low began to form along the front and interacted with a jet streak producing lift. As the temperatures on the backside of the front cooled and fell below freezing, the rain quickly turned to snow and thanks to the lift, made perfect conditions for lots of snow with rates receiving 1" an hour in some places. The winds also picked up to 30–35 mph causing many cases of blowing and drifting snow. This snow continued through the night with areas along and south of I-70 in Missouri and Indiana receiving more of a wintry mix and rain.

During the night and morning of February 2, a second upper-level low began to form over Texas. Snow accumulations occurred in areas west of I-35 while areas east received freezing rain and sleet. This system also began to advance northeastward along the cold front. Meanwhile, the first system also continued northeast and by the late-morning moved out of the Western Midwest and by the afternoon moved out of the rest of the area and into the northeast. But during the night, the second system moved back over the same area as the first bringing yet another round of snow to many of the same regions while areas in Arkansas and along the Ohio River Valley received heavy freezing rain and sleet.

The energy from the two systems began to merge over the northeast during the morning on Thursday, February 3. By this time the system had become so large that precipitation associated with the system was falling over nearly half of all the US states, from Texas to Maine, but with the bulk of it still over Texas and Arkansas. During the late morning this would shift to over the Ohio River Valley while snow began to become heavier in the northeast and moisture being pulled northward by the system would cause a small severe weather outbreak over Alabama. The storm continued to move northeast and by that night was over mainly the Northeast. Snow would continue through the day on Friday, February 4 before the bulk of the storm moved offshore in the early afternoon. It would reach a minimum pressure of 1,004 mb (29.6 inHg) around this time as well.

== Preparations ==
The National Weather Service issued winter storm watches from Wyoming to Maine. Winter Storm Warnings were also issued from New Mexico to Maine, and at least 18 states were under winter storm warnings. In northeastern Ohio, and Buffalo, New York, snow amounts of more than a foot were forecasted. Amtrak cancelled or modified the routes several trains due to the storm. In Phoenix Sky Harbor International Airport, 103 flights were cancelled and 82 were delayed.

=== United States ===
==== Deep South ====
Early on February 3, a tornado watch was issued by the Storm Prediction Center (SPC) for portions of Alabama and Mississippi. Additional flood watches were issued for portions of Alabama, Kentucky, Tennessee, and Georgia. The Texas Department of Transportation (TxDot) stated that crews will work on bridges and roads in response to the storm. On February 1, the University of Oklahoma closed campus for February 2–3. On February 3, the San Antonio Spurs modified their tip off time against the Miami Heat from 7:30 pm to 6 pm, due to the impacts from the winter storm.

==== Midwest ====
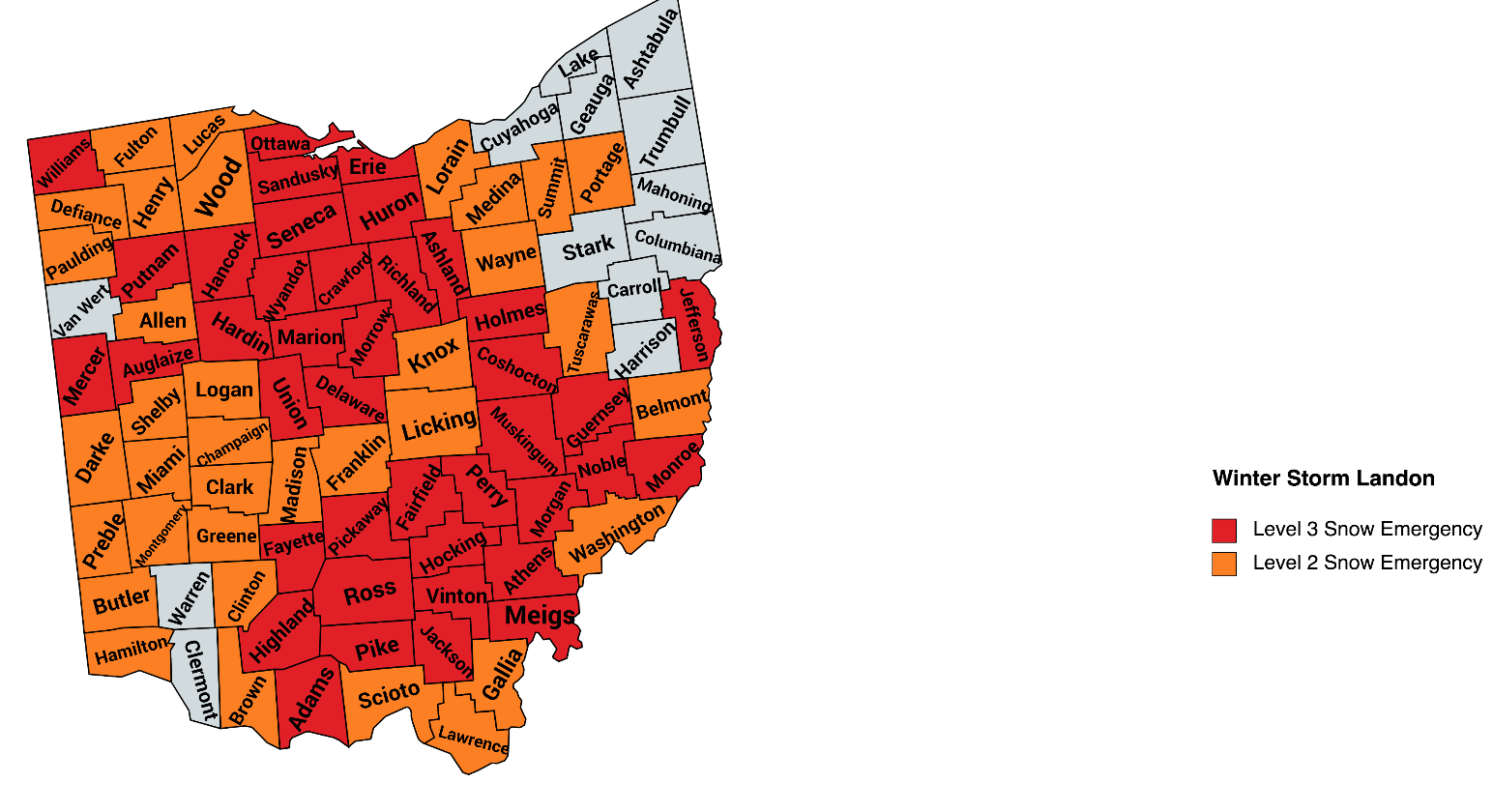
Ohio Snow Emergencies at their most severe levels during the storm

A state of emergency was declared in Missouri, Illinois, and Kentucky, as well as 50 National Guard troops being deployed in Indiana to assist stranded motorists. The University of Missouri moved to online classes for February 2–3. Many schools closed and moved to online classes in preparation for the storm. More than 3,000 flights were canceled, mainly airlines headed to Midwestern airports, and all airlines headed to St. Louis, Missouri were all canceled. In Michigan, buses, trains, and flights were all delayed, and some were canceled. The Gateway Arch National Park closed on February 2 due to the storm. Ohio State canceled classes for February 3. In Allen County, Indiana (City of Fort Wayne, Indiana) a snow emergency and travel warning was put in place to keep drivers off the roads. Reports of over an inch an hour were falling at that time, and those same conditions occurred in Indianapolis and Bloomington. An Indiana Hoosiers women's basketball game between the Indiana Hoosiers and Minnesota Golden Gophers at Simon Skjodt Assembly Hall was closed to the public.

==== Northeast ====
More than 600 flights were canceled to Northeastern U.S. airports on Wednesday in preparation of the winter storm. Cities including Burlington, Boston, and Providence issued snow emergencies due to the upcoming winter storm. Due to forecasted amounts of 7–13 in (18–33 cm) of snow, numerous schools in Western New York closed.

== Impact ==
=== United States ===
Because of the winter storm, 5,600 flights were canceled both on February 2 and February 3.

==== West ====
South of Colorado Springs, Colorado, nearly 2 feet (61 cm) of snow was reported. In Wyoming, around 3 inches of snow was reported in Cheyenne, Wyoming. In Utah, small amounts of snow were reported in the Salt Lake City, though little to no snow was reported in other regions of Utah, with small amounts being reported in Sandy, Provo, and Vernal.

==== Southwest ====
As much as 37 inches (94 cm) of snow was reported in Taos Ski Valley, New Mexico. At least 3 people were killed in New Mexico, 1 was killed in a weather–related pileup on I-40 in Bernalillo County, New Mexico, and 2 were killed when their car rolled 100 feet (30 m) down a mountain near Cedar Crest. An additional non–fatal tractor–trailer accident closed I-25 near Santa Fe.

==== Deep South ====
Due to wintry conditions across Dallas, Texas, Dallas/Fort Worth International Airport was closed on February 3. One person was killed in Dallas, when a semi-truck crashed while traveling on I-45 while traveling over I-30, an additional dog died in the crash as well. With 0.2 inches (0.51 cm) of sleet in Austin, the city set a daily snowfall record for February 3. Numerous state parks closed due to the winter storm in the San Antonio metropolitan area. 3 inches (7.6 cm) of snow were reported in Nashville, Tennessee, as well as 2 inches (5.1 cm) in Little Rock, Arkansas and Mayfield, Kentucky. Over 120,000 people lost power in Shelby County, Tennessee, and it took nearly two weeks for power to be restored. On I-10 near Kerrville, Texas, several semi-trucks were jackknifed, causing drivers to be stranded on the interstate for hours. A truck driver died on I-35 in Oklahoma after losing control on an icy part of the road. A person in Oklahoma died after crashing in an ATV on a snow-covered road. Ice impacts reached as far south as Corpus Christi, Texas.

===== Alabama =====
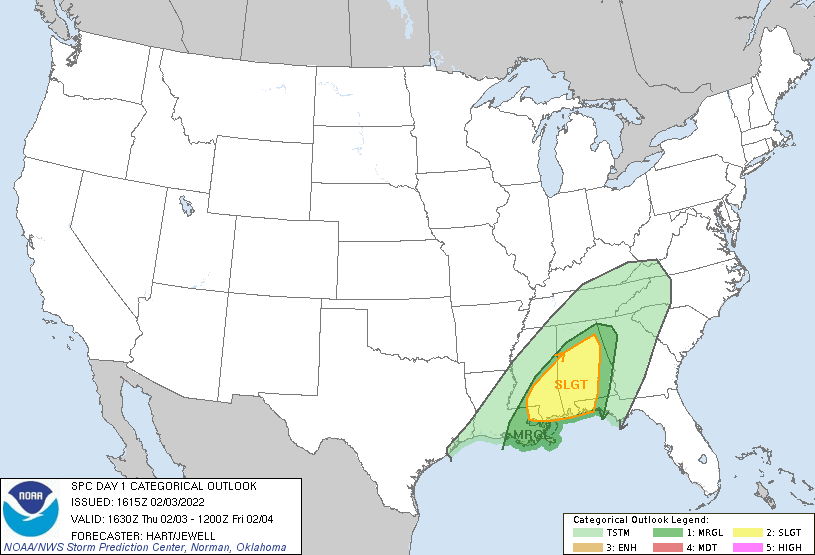
The severe weather outlook produced by the Storm Prediction Center (SPC) on February 3, 2022.

The warm side of the storm, in Alabama, had temperatures of nearly 70 °F (21 °C), an ingredient in forming powerful tornadoes. On the morning of February 3, the Storm Prediction Center (SPC) issued a slight risk for tornadoes for portions of Mississippi and Alabama. The storm system spawned a supercell that produced three EF2 tornadoes in Western Alabama, the second of which struck areas near Sawyerville and caused significant high-end EF2 damage. One person was killed and eight others were injured, including three seriously. Two additional tornadoes, both rated EF0, impacted Elmore County as well, resulting in minimal damage. The National Weather Service issued a particularly dangerous situation on the tornado warning for Sawyerville. The tornado damaged 60 homes and destroyed 20 others.

==== Midwest ====
In Missouri, I-70, I-44, and I-72 were all covered with snow and ice. In Illinois, a stretch of I-55 was closed due to motor accidents reported in the area, and parts of I-74 and I-57 also closed in Illinois. In Lewistown, Illinois, at least 14.4 inches (36.6 cm) of snow fell. Snow also resulted in the Veterans Airport of Southern Illinois completely closing down during the storm. Snow accumulated as high as 17 inches (44 cm) was reported in Columbia City, Indiana. A "weather-related" fatality occurred in Tennessee on February 4. There were also over 85,000 power outages in Ohio. Milwaukee, Wisconsin was “blitzed” by small amounts of snow and Madison, Wisconsin was also briefly affected. As far down as Kansas saw snow and ice, specifically in the Kansas City and Topeka areas. Lansing, Michigan saw its record highest snow, with 13.3 inches (34 cm). More snow was dropped in Nebraska, though it got less snow than neighboring Kansas, with the most snow in Omaha with 2 inches (5.1 cm).

==== Northeast ====
Large amounts of rain were reported in Connecticut and Rhode Island. Snow was reported in Albany, New York and over 17 inches (44 cm) was reported in areas of Vermont, Massachusetts, and Maine, specifically the areas of Burlington and Bangor. New York also recorded over 50,000 power outages. Around half of Ulster County lost power due to the storm. In New York City, the temperature plummeted by 16 °F (9 °C) in a period of just one hour early on February 4, from 7am to 8am, as temperatures dropped from 54 °F (12 °C) to 38 °F (3 °C). Hundreds of flights were delayed at both LaGuardia Airport and John F. Kennedy International Airport, although Long Island MacArthur Airport did not experience significant issues. Speed restrictions of 40 mph (64 km/h) were imposed on Interstate 90 in Massachusetts due to the storm.

=== Canada ===
==== Nova Scotia ====
After the winter storm exited to sea, Southern Nova Scotia saw small amounts of snow before the winter storm began moving northeast into the sea toward Greenland.

=== Greenland and Iceland ===
Greenland was briefly affected by the winter storm, though no major damage was reported due to the system dissipating a few hours later. Similar to Greenland, the remnants of the winter storm dropped snow in Iceland.

== Confirmed tornadoes ==
Confirmed tornadoes by Enhanced Fujita rating
EFU	EF0	EF1	EF2	EF3	EF4	EF5	Total
0	2	0	3	0	0	0	5

=== February 3 event ===
List of confirmed tornadoes – Thursday, February 3, 2022 (Note: All dates are based on the local time zone where the tornado touched down; however, all times are in Coordinated Universal Time for consistency.)
EF#	Location	County / Parish	State	Start Coord.	Time (UTC)	Path length	Max width
EF2	S of Cuba to S of Livingston	Sumter	AL	32.3565°N 88.3857°W	18:52–19:15	15.47 mi (24.90 km)	900 yd (820 m)
EF2	One home was shifted off its foundation with some of its walls collapsed, and numerous trees were downed. This was the first EF2 tornado produced by the western Alabama supercell.						
EF2	E of Tishabee to ESE of Akron	Greene, Hale	AL	32.6331°N 87.9639°W	19:38–20:16	25.87 mi (41.63 km)	1,700 yd (1,600 m)
EF2	1 death – Trees were downed at EF0 intensity along the beginning of the tornado's path in Greene County near the town of Forkland, some of which fell onto homes. The tornado then crossed into Hale County and intensified as it downed hundreds of trees and damaged or destroyed several manufactured homes, including an unoccupied dwelling that rolled over and landed upside-down on top of a car. After the weakening slightly, the tornado reintensified as it approached and crossed SR 14 north of Sawyerville. Several homes were damaged and a double-wide manufactured home was destroyed, causing several injuries. A fish truck was overturned with its load of fish scattered across the road and two pick-up trucks were thrown into a nearby pond. The tornado reached its peak intensity of high-end EF2 to the northeast as it tore a double-wide manufactured home from its anchors and tossed it approximately 50 yards (46 m) across a road, obliterating it. The one fatality from this tornado occurred here, along with two serious injuries. A home across the street sustained significant roof damage and had many windows blown out, and a manufactured home just to the south was split in half with one of the halves rolling away. Mainly tree damage occurred beyond this point before the tornado dissipated shortly after crossing SR 69. Eight people were injured in total. This was the second EF2 tornado produced by the western Alabama supercell.						
EF2	SSE of Duncanville	Hale, Bibb, Tuscaloosa	AL	32.9401°N 87.4512°W	20:31–20:42	7.6 mi (12.2 km)	725 yd (663 m)
EF2	The third EF2 tornado produced by the western Alabama supercell moved through the Talladega National Forest, snapping or uprooting countless large trees. A home also sustained shingle damage and sheet metal was removed from the roof of a barn.						
EF0	W of Holtville to Jordan Lake	Elmore	AL	32.6449°N 86.3553°W	23:02–23:03	2.13 mi (3.43 km)	100 yd (91 m)
EF0	A few metal carports were thrown, and numerous trees were downed.						
EF0	SW of Martin Dam	Elmore	AL	32.6722°N 85.9251°W	23:33–23:34	0.2 mi (0.32 km)	100 yd (91 m)
EF0	This brief tornado lofted the roof of one outbuilding and blew metal paneling off of another. One house lost shingles and another was damaged by a fallen tree. Several other trees were uprooted as well.						

== See also ==
- Weather of 2022
- List of North American tornadoes and tornado outbreaks
- February 13–17, 2021 North American winter storm
- February 15–20, 2021 North American winter storm
