= Saman =

Saman may refer to:

== Places ==
=== Iran ===
- Saman, Chaharmahal and Bakhtiari, a city in Chaharmahal and Bakhtiari Province
- Saman, Hamadan, a city in Hamadan Province
- Saman, Ilam, a village in Ilam Province
- Saman, Kurdistan, a village in Kurdistan Province
- Saman, Markazi, a village in Markazi Province
- Saman, Razavi Khorasan, a village in Razavi Khorasan Province
- Saman District (Iran), an administrative subdivision
- Saman Rural District, an administrative subdivision

=== Elsewhere ===
- Saman District, an administrative subdivision of Peru
- Saman, Rewa, a village in Rewa district in Madhya Pradesh, India
- Saman, Haute-Garonne, a village in southwestern France

== Other uses ==
- Saman (dance), an Indonesian traditional dance
- Saman (deity), a prominent Sri Lankan deity
- Saman (Deus Ex), a fictional character in the video game Deus Ex: Invisible War
- Saman (name), a list of people with the given name or surname
- Saman (novel), a 1998 novel by Ayu Utami
- Saman, a 2014 album by Icelandic cellist Hildur Guðnadóttir
- MV Saman, a Maltese oil tanker in service 2008–12
- Saman tree, Samanea saman

== See also ==
- Shaman (disambiguation)
- Samen, a city in Hamadan Province, Iran
