= Holtville High School =

Coordinates: 32°38′09″N 86°19′35″W

Location
- 10425 Holtville Road; Deatsville, Alabama 36022; United States

Information
- Type: Public
- Established: 1929 (97 years ago)
- School district: Elmore County Public School System
- CEEB code: 010850
- Principal: Sean Kreauter
- Staff: 30.00 (FTE)
- Grades: 9-12
- Enrollment: 564 (2023-2024)
- Student to teacher ratio: 18.80
- Colors: Green and white and black
- Athletics: Baseball, Basketball, Cheerleading, Cross Country, Dance, Football, Golf, Soccer, Softball, Tennis, Volleyball, and Wrestling
- Mascot: Bulldog
- Website: hhs.elmoreco.com

Holtville High School in Elmore County, Alabama serves grades 9-12 and is part of the Elmore County Public School System. As of 2008, the schools student body consisted of over 450 enrolled students and 40 staff members. The school offers 72 courses that include AP and dual enrollment college classes.

== Campus ==
The campus houses nineteen classrooms, two science labs, a yearbook staff office, four teacher lounges, an agricultural green house and shop, three computer labs, a library with stage, a home economics center with three full kitchens, a band building, and a cafeteria. The athletic facilities include two gymnasiums with two basketball courts, one volleyball court, and a weight room. The athletic facilities also offers three tennis courts, a football and soccer field (Boykin Field), football field house, cheerleading building, practice field, baseball stadium, and softball stadium. During the summer of 2012, the school underwent construction to remodel the guidance office, main office, and convert the old cafeteria into a state-of-the-art science lab, as well as several exterior improvements.

== Achievements ==
=== Academic ===
95% of the Class of 2007 passed all portions of the Alabama High School Graduation Exam. The passage rates were: Math - 100%; Language - 99%; Reading - 99%; Science - 96%; Social Studies - 95%. In 2007 testing 84% of the Class of 2009 scored proficient (Level III or IV) on the Alabama Direct Assessment of Writing. Scores increased from 70% proficient to 84% proficient. Narrative proficiency increased from 89% to 97%; persuasive proficiency increased from 64% to 87%; expository proficiency increased from 60% to 69%. Has obtained AYP every year since it has begun. Also, was named an Honours School in 2006–2007. In 2008 the school was rated number 3 in public schools in the state of Alabama. The school has graduated with a National Merit Finalist in 2009 and 2010.

=== Athletics ===
The varsity cheerleading squad obtained the title of national champions in December 2007. They earned this title at the WCA national championship in Nashville, Tennessee. The Varsity Baseball team won a state title in 2023. The Green Machine Band Program has also obtained numerous awards throughout the years.
