= Seman =

Seman, Semans or SEMAN may refer to:

- Seman (river), river in Albania
- Seman, Alabama, a populated place in the United States
- Seman, Iran, a village
- Semans, Saskatchewan, a village in Canada

== People with the name ==
- Bill Seman (1944–2021), Canadian football player
- Daniel Seman (born 1979), Czech ice hockey player
- Marek Seman (born 1976), Slovak football player
- Mary Semans (1920–2012), American politician, and philanthropist
- Stanislav Seman (born 1952), Czechoslovak football player
- Seman Laxfield (fl. 1397–1404), English politician
