= Blue Ridge, Alabama =

- Unincorporated community Census-designated place
- Location in Elmore County and the state of Alabama
- Coordinates: 32°29′42″N 86°11′07″W
- Country: United States
- State: Alabama
- County: Elmore

Area
  - Total: 7.85 sq mi (20.32 km^{2})
  - Land: 7.76 sq mi (20.09 km^{2})
  - Water: 0.089 sq mi (0.23 km^{2})
- Elevation: 433 ft (132 m)

Population (2020)
  - Total: 1,485
  - Density: 191.4/sq mi (73.91/km^{2})
- Time zone: UTC-6 (Central (CST))
  - Summer (DST): UTC-5 (CDT)
- FIPS code: 01-07588
- GNIS feature ID: 2402696

Blue Ridge is an unincorporated community and census-designated place (CDP) in Elmore County, Alabama, United States. At the 2020 census, the population was 1,485. It is part of the Montgomery Metropolitan Statistical Area.

== Geography ==
Blue Ridge is located in southern Elmore County. It is bordered to the west by Wetumpka, the county seat, and to the southeast by Redland.

According to the U.S. Census Bureau, the CDP has a total area of 7.8 square miles (20.3 km^{2}), of which 7.8 square miles (20.1 km^{2}) is land and 0.1 square miles (0.2 km^{2}), or 1.13%, is water.

== Demographics ==
Historical population
Census	Pop.	Note	%±
1990	1,151		—
2000	1,331		15.6%
2010	1,341		0.8%
2020	1,485		10.7%
U.S. Decennial Census

Blue Ridge first appeared as a census designated place in the 1990 U.S. Census.

=== Racial and ethnic composition ===
Blue Ridge CDP, Alabama – Racial and ethnic composition Note: the US Census treats Hispanic/Latino as an ethnic category. This table excludes Latinos from the racial categories and assigns them to a separate category. Hispanics/Latinos may be of any race.
Race / Ethnicity (NH = Non-Hispanic)	Pop 1990	Pop 2000	Pop 2010	Pop 2020	% 1990	% 2000	% 2010	% 2020
White alone (NH)	1,107	1,270	1,256	1,320	96.18%	95.42%	93.66%	88.89%
Black or African American alone (NH)	31	41	36	56	2.69%	3.08%	2.68%	3.77%
Native American or Alaska Native alone (NH)	1	5	10	5	0.09%	0.38%	0.75%	0.34%
Asian alone (NH)	3	2	12	16	0.26%	0.15%	0.89%	1.08%
Native Hawaiian or Pacific Islander alone (NH)	x	1	2	0	x	0.08%	0.15%	0.00%
Other race alone (NH)	0	0	0	3	0.00%	0.00%	0.00%	0.20%
Mixed race or Multiracial (NH)	x	5	12	68	x	0.38%	0.89%	4.58%
Hispanic or Latino (any race)	9	7	13	17	0.78%	0.53%	0.97%	1.14%
Total	1,151	1,331	1,341	1,485	100.00%	100.00%	100.00%	100.00%

=== 2020 census ===
As of the 2020 census, Blue Ridge had a population of 1,485. The median age was 54.3 years. 16.1% of residents were under the age of 18 and 33.8% of residents were 65 years of age or older. For every 100 females there were 89.7 males, and for every 100 females age 18 and over there were 87.1 males age 18 and over.

0.0% of residents lived in urban areas, while 100.0% lived in rural areas.

There were 623 households in Blue Ridge, of which 23.6% had children under the age of 18 living in them. Of all households, 60.0% were married-couple households, 16.1% were households with a male householder and no spouse or partner present, and 21.5% were households with a female householder and no spouse or partner present. About 24.4% of all households were made up of individuals and 13.4% had someone living alone who was 65 years of age or older.

There were 664 housing units, of which 6.2% were vacant. The homeowner vacancy rate was 1.5% and the rental vacancy rate was 13.5%.

=== 2010 census ===
As of the census of 2010, there were 1,341 people, 556 households, and 436 families residing in the CDP. The population density was 166.4 inhabitants per square mile (64.2/km^{2}). There were 581 housing units at an average density of 73.5 per square mile (28.4/km^{2}). The racial makeup of the CDP was 94.5% White, 2.7% Black or African American, 0.7% Native American, 0.9% Asian, 0.1% Pacific Islander, and 0.9% from two or more races. 1.0% of the population were Hispanic or Latino of any race.

There were 556 households, out of which 20.0% had children under the age of 18 living with them, 70.9% were married couples living together, 5.2% had a female householder with no husband present, and 21.6% were non-families. 19.6% of all households were made up of individuals, and 7.9% had someone living alone who was 65 years of age or older. The average household size was 2.41 and the average family size was 2.73.

In the CDP, the population was spread out, with 16.6% under the age of 18, 5.2% from 18 to 24, 15.0% from 25 to 44, 41.2% from 45 to 64, and 22.0% who were 65 years of age or older. The median age was 52.7 years. For every 100 females, there were 99.3 males. For every 100 females age 18 and over, there were 93.2 males.

The median income for a household in the CDP was $84,135, and the median income for a family was $85,066. Males had a median income of $69,141 versus $46,029 for females. The per capita income for the CDP was $40,625. None of the families and 0% of the population were living below the poverty line, including no under eighteens and none of those over 64.

=== 2000 census ===
As of the census of 2000, there were 1,331 people, 511 households, and 436 families residing in the CDP. The population density was 169.3 inhabitants per square mile (65.4/km^{2}). There were 526 housing units at an average density of 66.9 per square mile (25.8/km^{2}). The racial makeup of the CDP was 95.79% White, 3.08% Black or African American, 0.38% Native American, 0.30% Asian, 0.08% Pacific Islander, and 0.38% from two or more races. 0.53% of the population were Hispanic or Latino of any race.

There were 511 households, out of which 30.7% had children under the age of 18 living with them, 0.0% were married couples living together, 6.5% had a female householder with no husband present, and 14.5% were non-families. 13.1% of all households were made up of individuals, and 5.3% had someone living alone who was 65 years of age or older. The average household size was 2.60 and the average family size was 2.84.

In the CDP, the population was spread out, with 22.2% under the age of 18, 4.7% from 18 to 24, 21.0% from 25 to 44, 37.6% from 45 to 64, and 14.6% who were 65 years of age or older. The median age was 46 years. For every 100 females, there were 101.4 males. For every 100 females age 18 and over, there were 94.4 males.

The median income for a household in the CDP was $73,162, and the median income for a family was $83,320. Males had a median income of $60,625 versus $37,875 for females. The per capita income for the CDP was $32,774. None of the families and 1.1% of the population were living below the poverty line, including no under eighteens and none of those over 64.

== Education ==
It is in the Elmore County Public School System.
