= Lynchings in Elmore County, Alabama =

Map of Alabama with Elmore County in red

Elmore County is a county located in the east-central portion of the U.S. state of Alabama. Throughout its history, there have been many lynchings in the county including on July 2, 1901, when a local mob lynched Robert (or perhaps Robin) White. In a strange turn of events, a local farmer, George White confessed in court to the killing and named five other local men as killers. Four men, including Howard, were convicted for the lynching. Howard was found guilty of first degree murder and sentenced to life in prison, while the other three men each received 10-year sentences for second degree murder. On June 9, 1902, three of the four defendants were pardoned by Governor Jelks. The exception was John Thomas, who was seen as the most culpable member of the mob since he had incited the lynching. Numerous appeals for a pardon were rejected, and Thomas was later killed by a falling tree during a windstorm while on work release on January 3, 1906.

Lynching is an extrajudicial killing by a group. In the Jim Crow American South, it was also used as an extreme form of informal group social control, and it is often conducted with the display of a public spectacle (often in the form of hanging) for maximum intimidation. Victims often professed their innocence right up to the public deaths in front of crowds that sometimes numbered in the thousands. Lynching victims were never given their time in court to prove their innocence.

== Lynching in Elmore County, Alabama ==
Name	Age	Ethnicity	City	County or Parish	State	Year	Alleged Accusation	Comment
Lewis Hendricks		African-American		Elmore County	Alabama	February 20, 1894	Murdering a white woman, Mrs. Jesse Rucker	After being accused Hendricks tried to escape but was shot twice and badly wounded. Dogs were sent to track down Hendricks and he was caught and surrounded by armed citizens. Hendricks was shot three times and managed to jump into Callaway Creek in an attempt to escape but he died of his injuries. He was the third man to be accused of the crime. Sources give the location of the lynching as the swamps 10 miles (16 km) from Jemison/Jamison in Chilton County, Alabama
Rufus Swindle	21	African-American	12 miles (19 km) from Wetumpka	Elmore County	Alabama	March 30, 1895	Swindle was a witness of an illegal moonshine operation of Josephus Jowers	Rufus Swindle was taken from his house in the middle of the night in 1895 by Josephus Jowers, Will Jowers, Alonzo Edwards, John Edwards, Luther Ingram and possibly others. This group of men took Swindle to the woods where they whipped, shot and killed him.
Solomon Jackson, Camp Reese, Louis Spier and Jesse Thompson		African-American	Wetumpka	Elmore County	Alabama	Broken out of jail on June 17, 1898	Arrested as potential witnesses in the robbery and arson of a William Carden and his wife's home in which $1200 ($45,000 in 2024) was stolen.	In 1898 a mob of 500 stormed the county jail where Solomon Jackson, Camp Reese, Louis Spier and Jesse Thompson were being held. A few prominent citizens and a Methodist minister tried talking the mob away from violence but they were unsuccessful. The sheriff had hidden the jail keys so that the mob couldn't get into the cells but they took a crowbar and took the cell doors off of their hinges and kidnapped the four men. The mob took the four men and had planned to burn them alive but they thought that troops would intervene before long so instead the men were hanged.
Wallace Townsend	16	African-American	Eclectic	Elmore County	Alabama	October 2, 1900	Attempted assault of white woman, Mrs. G. S. Harrinton a cousin of Ms. Kate Pierson	Three other black boys were arrested with Townsend, Frank and Jake Floyd and Virgil Miller. Wallace Townsend was taken by the mob to the local graveyard and tied to a stake. Wood was piled around him and Mr G. S. Harrinton lit the pyre, burning him alive.
Zeb Floyd	Including Floyd there were nine arrested in the attack, all under 21-years-old.	African-American	Eclectic	Elmore County	Alabama	September 10, 1900	Assault of Ms. Kate Pierson, a cousin of Mrs. G. S. Harrinton	Including Floyd there were nine arrested in the attack. Some of the nine are Zeb, Jake and Frank Floyd
Robert (or Robin) White	27	African-American	Tallassee	Elmore County	Alabama	1901	Attempted murder	Robert (or Robin) White was lynched by a white mob in 1901. White tried to fight back against the mob but he was overpowered, dragged into a swamp, and then murdered. Almost everything that is known of Robert White's case comes from the testimony of one of the white men in the mob. A man named George Howard confessed to the lynching of White. Howard told what happened, the attempts at keeping the rest of the mob quiet, and names of other men in the mob. This testimony led to an all white jury convicting four white men of lynching a black man. This was unheard of at the time and a sentence like this wasn't passed again in an Alabama court until 1981.
Berney		African-American		Elmore County	Alabama	1912	Buggy accident	In 1912 Berney and another black man were accused of carelessly driving a buggy and causing two white farmer's daughter's horse to run away. A mob of white citizens chased the two men into the woods where they were cornered and the mob and two men began shooting at each other. Two people in the mob were killed and the two black men managed to escape to a cabin. When the mob reached the cabin one man was able to escape but Berney was shot and burned.
Ed and William Smith		African-American	Wetumpka	Elmore County	Alabama	January 4, 1915	Murder of R.A. Stillwell	Stillwell was shot while guarding his barns, bloodhounds from the murder scene led to the cabin where the Smiths were staying.

== National memorial ==
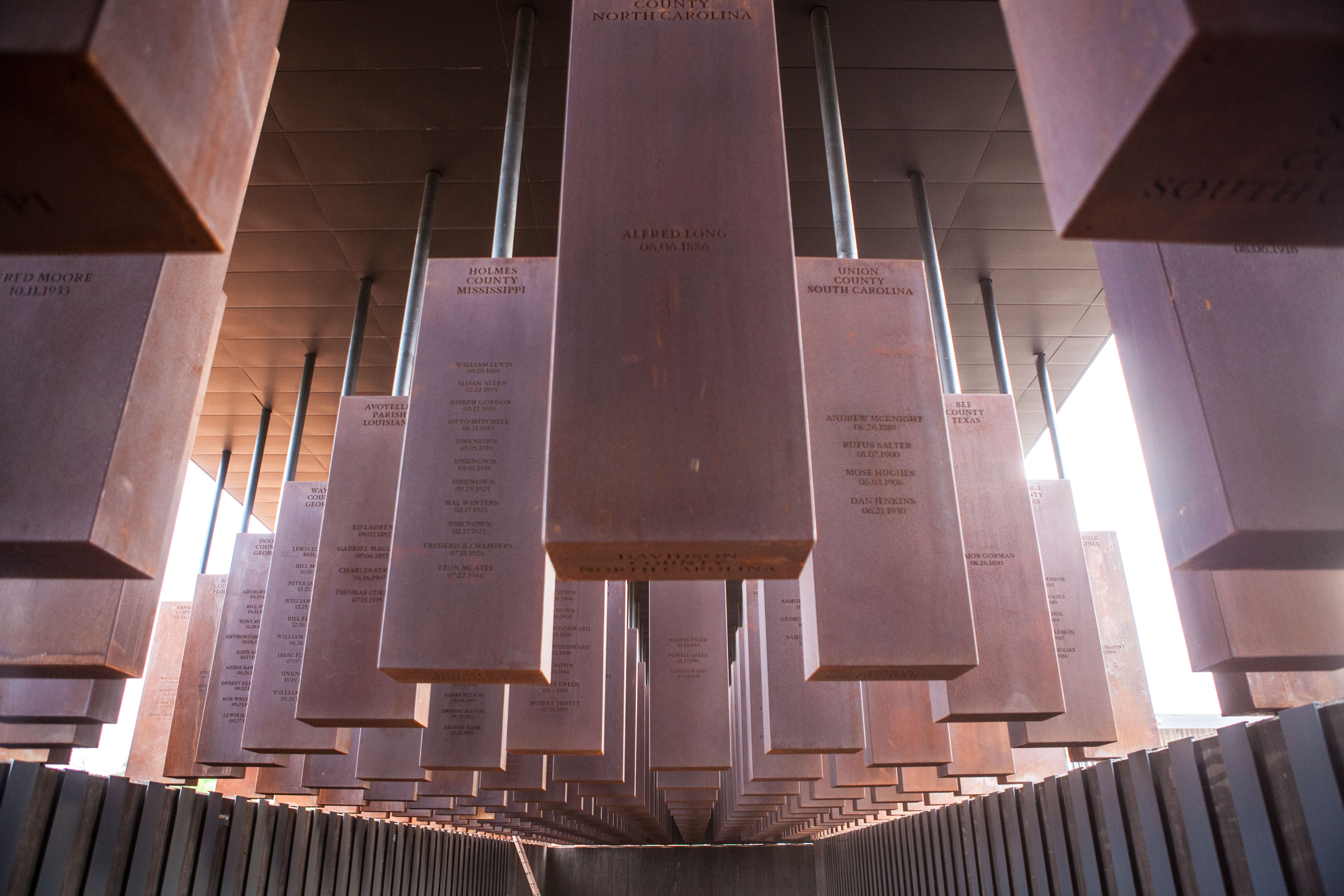
Memorial Corridor, National Memorial for Peace and Justice

The National Memorial for Peace and Justice opened in Montgomery, Alabama, on April 26, 2018. Featured among other things is the Memorial Corridor which displays 805 hanging steel rectangles, each representing the counties in the United States where a documented lynching took place and, for each county, the names of those lynched. The memorial hopes that communities, like Elmore County where these people were lynched, will take these slabs and install them in their own communities.

== See also ==
- List of lynching victims in the United States

== Bibliography ==
Notes

References

- "The terrible fate of a black brute". The Age-Herald. Birmingham, Jefferson, Alabama: Age-Herald. October 3, 1900. pp. 1–8. ISSN 2692-4099. OCLC 14948274.
- "Mob lynches two negroes for murder". New Britain Herald. New Britain, Hartford County, Connecticut: Herald Pub. Co. January 4, 1915. pp. 1–12. OCLC 173714341.
- Brown, Melissa (2022). "An era of terror: Montgomery family remembers father's lynching, legacy". Montgomery Advertiser.
- "Shot to death by citizens". The Indianapolis Journal. Indianapolis, Marion, Indiana: Douglass & Conner. February 21, 1894. pp. 1–8. ISSN 2332-0974. OCLC 8811247.
- Lyman, Brian (February 19, 2019). "The lynching of Robin White and the confession of George Howard". PUB.
- Robertson, Campbell (April 25, 2018). "A Lynching Memorial Is Opening. The Country Has Never Seen Anything Like It". The New York Times.
- "In Mob's hands: Five Negroes taken from an Alabama jail". The Topeka State Journal. Topeka, Shawnee, Kansas. June 17, 1898. pp. 1–8. ISSN 2377-7117. OCLC 9124974.
- University of Alabama (2022). "Rufus Swindle". University of Alabama.
