= Shaman (disambiguation) =

A shaman is a spiritual practitioner who interacts with the spirit world through altered states of consciousness, such as trance.

Shaman or Shamans may also refer to:

== Places ==
- Mount Shaman, Transbaikalia, Russia
- Shaman Rock, Transbaikalia, Russia
- Shaman-Gora archaeological site, Russia
- Shaman, Iran, a village in Semnan Province, Iran

== Arts, entertainment, and media ==
=== Gaming ===
- Shaman (character class), a character class in role-playing games
- Shaman (Dungeons & Dragons), a character class in the role-playing game Dungeons & Dragons
- Shaman (Dungeons & Dragons supplement), a supplement in the role-playing game Dungeons & Dragons describing the Shaman character class

=== Literature ===
- Shaman (Marvel Comics), a Marvel Comics character
- Shaman (novel), a 2013 novel by Kim Stanley Robinson

=== Music ===
- Shaman (album), a 2002 album by musician Carlos Santana
- Shaman (band), a Brazilian power metal band, briefly spelled as Shaaman
- Shaman (singer), an alias of Yaroslav Dronov, a Russian singer
- Shamans (album), a 2002 album by musician Aziza Mustafa Zadeh
- Korpiklaani, a Finnish folk metal band formerly known as Shaman
- The Shamen, a British dance band
- "Shaman", a song by the 3rd and the Mortal from the album Tears Laid in Earth
- "Shaman", a song by Amorphis from the album Silent Waters
- "Shaman's Blues", a song by The Doors from the album The Soft Parade

== Other uses ==
- Aerodyne Shaman, a series of French single-place paragliders
- Avtoros Shaman, an 8x8 all-terrain vehicle
- Jacob Chansley, an American far-right conspiracy theorist known as the QAnon Shaman

== See also ==
- Saman (disambiguation)
- Sharman, a surname and given name
