= Jamie Winborn =

American football player (born 1979)

No. 50, 51, 52, 55
- Position: Linebacker

Personal information
- Born: May 14, 1979 (age 47); Wetumpka, Alabama, U.S.
- Listed height: 5 ft 11 in (1.80 m)
- Listed weight: 230 lb (104 kg)

Career information
- High school: Wetumpka
- College: Vanderbilt (1997–2000)
- NFL draft: 2001: 2nd round, 47th overall pick

Career history
- San Francisco 49ers (2001–2005); Jacksonville Jaguars (2005); Tampa Bay Buccaneers (2006); Denver Broncos (2007–2008); Atlanta Falcons (2009)*; Houston Texans (2009); Tennessee Titans (2009–2010)
- * Offseason or practice squad member only

Awards and highlights
- PFWA All-Rookie Team (2001); Freshman All-American (1998); First-team All-SEC (1999); 2× Second-team All-SEC (1998, 2000)

Career NFL statistics
- Total tackles: 357
- Sacks: 10
- Forced fumbles: 4
- Fumble recoveries: 4
- Interceptions: 3
- Stats at Pro Football Reference

Jamie Winborn (born May 14, 1979) is an American former professional football player who was a linebacker in the National Football League (NFL). He was selected by the San Francisco 49ers in the second round of the 2001 NFL draft. He played college football for the Vanderbilt Commodores.

Winborn also played for the Jacksonville Jaguars, Tampa Bay Buccaneers, Denver Broncos, Atlanta Falcons, and Houston Texans.

== Early life ==
Winborn played high school football at Wetumpka High School in Wetumpka, Alabama, where he played linebacker and fullback. During his senior year, he named all-metro, all-region, all-district and second-team all-state after posting 137 tackles.

== College career ==
Winborn played college football for the Vanderbilt Commodores, where he was a three-year starter. He led the Southeastern Conference (SEC) in tackles during his freshman and sophomore seasons. Because of his great play he was honored with second-team All-America by Football News and was a First-team All-SEC during his sophomore year and All-American by The Sporting News during his freshman year. He finished his college career with 377 tackles, 16.5 sacks, and two forced fumbles.

== Professional career ==
=== San Francisco 49ers ===
Winborn was selected by the San Francisco 49ers in the second round of the 2001 NFL draft with the 47th overall pick. He played five years for the 49ers, recording 190 tackles, nine sacks, and three interceptions.

=== Jacksonville Jaguars ===
On October 8, 2005, Winborn was traded to the Jacksonville Jaguars for a seventh round draft pick in the 2006 NFL draft. He would finish his short time with the Jaguars playing in five games and recording four tackles.

=== Tampa Bay Buccaneers ===
On April 4, 2006, he signed with the Tampa Bay Buccaneers. He would spend one season with the Bucs playing in 14 games, recording 12 tackles.

=== Denver Broncos ===
On September 11, 2007, he signed with the Denver Broncos. In two years with the team he started 13 of 30 games, recording 133 tackles and a sack. The Broncos released him on February 16, 2009.

=== Atlanta Falcons ===
Winborn was signed by the Atlanta Falcons on August 1, 2009, and cut on September 5, 2009.

=== Houston Texans ===
Winborn signed with the Houston Texans on October 21, 2009. He was waived on October 30.

=== Tennessee Titans ===
Winborn signed with the Tennessee Titans on December 21, 2009, after linebackers Keith Bulluck and David Thornton were placed on injured reserve. On October 9, 2010, Winborn was released by the Titans, in order for the Titans to move linebacker Gerald McRath off the Reserve/Suspended list and onto the active roster. For the season to that point (four games), Winborn started three games and had eight tackles.

== NFL career statistics ==
Legend
**Bold**	Career high

=== Regular season ===
Year	Team	Games		Tackles					Interceptions					Fumbles			
Year	Team	GP	GS	Cmb	Solo	Ast	Sck	TFL	Int	Yds	TD	Lng	PD	FF	FR	Yds	TD
2001	SF	14	4	54	41	13	0.5	2	**2**	**40**	0	**29**	3	0	1	**17**	0
2002	SF	3	3	26	20	6	1.0	4	0	0	0	0	2	0	0	0	0
2003	SF	9	0	37	34	3	3.0	4	0	0	0	0	2	1	1	13	0
2004	SF	14	10	63	54	9	**4.5**	**5**	1	1	0	1	8	**2**	**2**	10	0
2005	SF	3	2	13	8	5	0.0	1	0	0	0	0	1	0	0	0	0
2005	JAX	5	0	4	4	0	0.0	1	0	0	0	0	0	0	0	0	0
2006	TAM	14	0	13	9	4	0.0	0	0	0	0	0	0	1	0	0	0
2007	DEN	14	2	34	27	7	0.5	2	0	0	0	0	1	0	0	0	0
2008	DEN	**16**	**11**	**99**	**74**	**25**	0.5	**5**	0	0	0	0	**11**	0	0	0	0
2009	TEN	2	0	2	2	0	0.0	0	0	0	0	0	0	0	0	0	0
2010	TEN	6	3	12	8	4	0.0	0	0	0	0	0	0	0	0	0	0
		100	35	357	281	76	10.0	24	3	41	0	29	28	4	4	40	0

=== Playoffs ===
Year	Team	Games		Tackles					Interceptions					Fumbles			
Year	Team	GP	GS	Cmb	Solo	Ast	Sck	TFL	Int	Yds	TD	Lng	PD	FF	FR	Yds	TD
2001	SF	**1**	0	**2**	**1**	**1**	0.0	0	0	0	0	0	0	0	0	0	0
		1	0	2	1	1	0.0	0	0	0	0	0	0	0	0	0	0
