= Booth, Alabama =

Unincorporated community in Alabama, United States

- Unincorporated community
- Location in Alabama
- Coordinates: 32°30′01″N 86°34′19″W
- Country: United States
- State: Alabama
- County: Autauga
- Elevation: 282 ft (86 m)
- Time zone: UTC-6 (Central (CST))
  - Summer (DST): UTC-5 (CDT)
- ZIP code: 36008
- Area codes: 205, 659
- GNIS feature ID: 114739

Booth is an unincorporated community in Autauga County, Alabama, United States. It was named after the Booth family. Booth lies along U.S. Route 82 8 mi (13 km) northwest of the city of Prattville, the county seat of Autauga County. US 82 also runs northwest 29 mi (47 km) to Maplesville. It has a post office that was established in 1899.

Booth is part of the Montgomery Metropolitan Statistical Area.

Fire protection is provided by the Booth Volunteer Fire Department. Emergency Medical Services are provided by Haynes Ambulance. The local law enforcement agency is the Autauga County Sheriffs Office.
