= Emerald Mountain, Alabama =

- Census-designated place
- Location of Emerald Mountain in Elmore County, Alabama.
- Coordinates: 32°26′16″N 86°06′23″W
- Country: United States
- State: Alabama
- County: Elmore

Area
  - Total: 16.75 sq mi (43.38 km^{2})
  - Land: 16.09 sq mi (41.67 km^{2})
  - Water: 0.66 sq mi (1.71 km^{2})
- Elevation: 203 ft (62 m)

Population (2020)
  - Total: 3,310
  - Density: 205.7/sq mi (79.43/km^{2})
- Time zone: UTC-6 (Central (CST))
  - Summer (DST): UTC-5 (CDT)
- Area code: 334
- GNIS feature ID: 2582673

Emerald Mountain is a census-designated place in Elmore County, Alabama, United States. As of the 2020 census, Emerald Mountain had a population of 3,310.

It is a planned community with an Architectural Review Board and a Homeowners Association of which membership is mandatory.

Community facilities include a tennis center, equestrian center and golf club.

== Demographics ==
Historical population
Census	Pop.	Note	%±
2010	2,561		—
2020	3,310		29.2%
U.S. Decennial Census

Emerald Mountain was listed as a census designated place in the 2010 U.S. census.

=== Racial and ethnic composition ===
Emerald Mountain CDP, Alabama – Racial and ethnic composition Note: the US Census treats Hispanic/Latino as an ethnic category. This table excludes Latinos from the racial categories and assigns them to a separate category. Hispanics/Latinos may be of any race.
Race / Ethnicity (NH = Non-Hispanic)	Pop 2010	Pop 2020	% 2010	% 2020
White alone (NH)	2,198	2,503	85.83%	75.62%
Black or African American alone (NH)	281	488	10.97%	14.74%
Native American or Alaska Native alone (NH)	4	13	0.16%	0.39%
Asian alone (NH)	16	53	0.62%	1.60%
Native Hawaiian or Pacific Islander alone (NH)	0	1	0.00%	0.03%
Other race alone (NH)	2	19	0.08%	0.57%
Mixed race or Multiracial (NH)	18	149	0.70%	4.50%
Hispanic or Latino (any race)	42	84	1.64%	2.54%
Total	2,561	3,310	100.00%	100.00%

=== 2020 census ===
As of the 2020 census, Emerald Mountain had a population of 3,310. The median age was 42.4 years. 24.5% of residents were under the age of 18 and 16.7% of residents were 65 years of age or older. For every 100 females there were 97.5 males, and for every 100 females age 18 and over there were 89.0 males age 18 and over.

0.0% of residents lived in urban areas, while 100.0% lived in rural areas.

There were 1,210 households in Emerald Mountain, of which 40.2% had children under the age of 18 living in them. Of all households, 66.4% were married-couple households, 10.4% were households with a male householder and no spouse or partner present, and 21.2% were households with a female householder and no spouse or partner present. About 17.4% of all households were made up of individuals and 8.8% had someone living alone who was 65 years of age or older.

There were 1,250 housing units, of which 3.2% were vacant. The homeowner vacancy rate was 1.8% and the rental vacancy rate was 0.0%.

== Education ==
It is in the Elmore County Public School System.
