= Duty (village) =

Rural locality in Zabaykalsky Krai, Russia

Coordinates: 50°59′31″N 110°47′11″E

Duty (Russian: Ду́тый, also known as "Дуты" or "Дутово") is a village (selo) in the southern part of Khiloksky District of Zabaykalsky Krai, Russia, located at the confluence of the Duty and Arey Rivers, 65 kilometers (40 mi) away from Khilok.

In the 1950s, a logging post of Areysky Logging-Lumbering Enterprise was located here. During the 1970s and 1980s, Duty was home to a Soviet Army engineering battalion building the road between Ulan-Ude and Chita. Duty was abandoned in 2002 because of the devastating wildfire, but, as of 2004, it was not officially abolished.

The archeological complex of Shaman-Gora is located in the vicinity of the village.
