= Elmore County Public School System =

School district in Alabama

The Elmore County Public School System is a public school district serving most of Elmore County, Alabama.

Its headquarters are in Wetumpka. In addition to Wetumpka, it includes the towns of Coosada, Deatsville, Eclectic, and Elmore, as well as the census designated places of Blue Ridge, Emerald Mountain, Holtville, and Redland. It also includes Elmore County sections of Millbrook (vast majority of the municipality) and Prattville (a portion of the municipality).

By 2019, Elmore County Schools allowed Maxwell Air Force Base on-post families to send their children to its schools. As of 2025, the district's allowance applies to any district school, and any student with a parent or guardian associated with the U.S. military is eligible. In August 2019, of the children who are dependents of military families attached to Maxwell AFB who were enrolled in public schools, 11.31% attended Elmore schools.

== History ==
A candidate for the Elmore County Board of Education quoted in an article in the Montgomery Advertiser argued that the county school system sufficiently meets the needs of the citizens of Millbrook, Alabama, and that the school system lacked "local financial support" but did well academically.

The Southern Association of Colleges and Schools awarded accreditation to the district in 2008.

In 2020, a scandal arose regarding spending irregularities.

== Schools ==
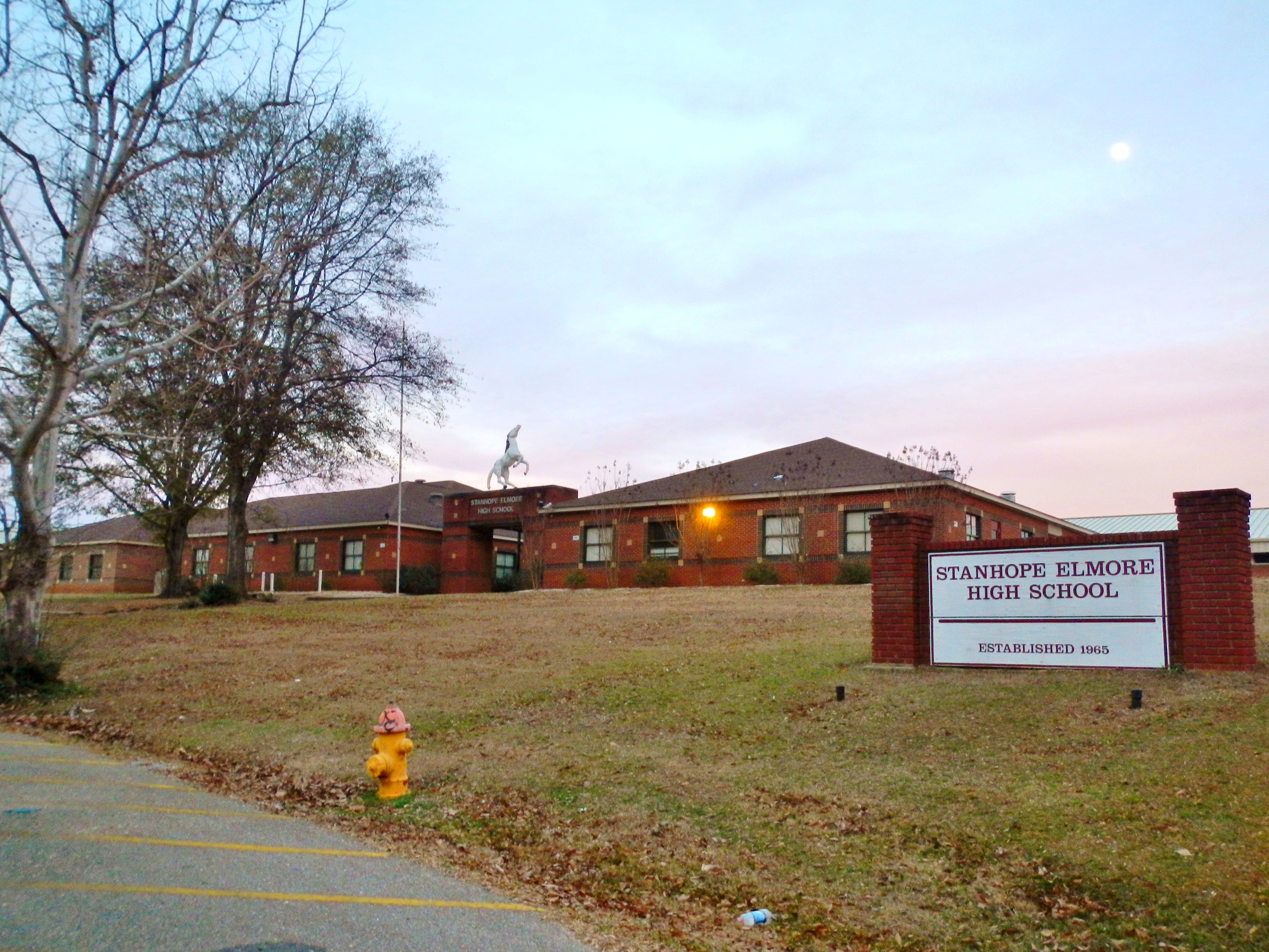
Stanhope Elmore High School

The district's 15 schools have over 10,000 students.

=== High schools ===
Traditional (grades 9-12)

- Elmore County High School (Eclectic)
- Holtville High School (unincorporated area near Deatsville)
- Stanhope Elmore High School (Millbrook)
- Wetumpka High School (Wetumpka)

=== Middle schools (grades 6-8) ===
- Eclectic Middle School (Eclectic)
- Holtville Middle School (near Deatsville)
- Millbrook Middle School (Millbrook)
- Redland Middle School (Redland, unincorporated area near Wetumpka)
- Wetumpka Middle School (Wetumpka) - formed by a merger of Wetumpka Intermediate School and Wetumpka Junior High School

=== Elementary schools ===
- Eclectic Elementary School (kindergarten-grade 4 [K-4], Eclectic)
- Holtville Elementary School (K-4, near Deatsville)
- Wetumpka Elementary School (K-4, Wetumpka)
- Redland Elementary School (K-4, Redland, unincorporated area near Wetumpka) - scheduled to open in the fall of 2009
- Airport Road Intermediate School (K-2, Coosada) - scheduled to open in the fall of 2009
- Coosada Elementary School (K-4, Millbrook near Coosada)
