= Elmore, Alabama =

- Town
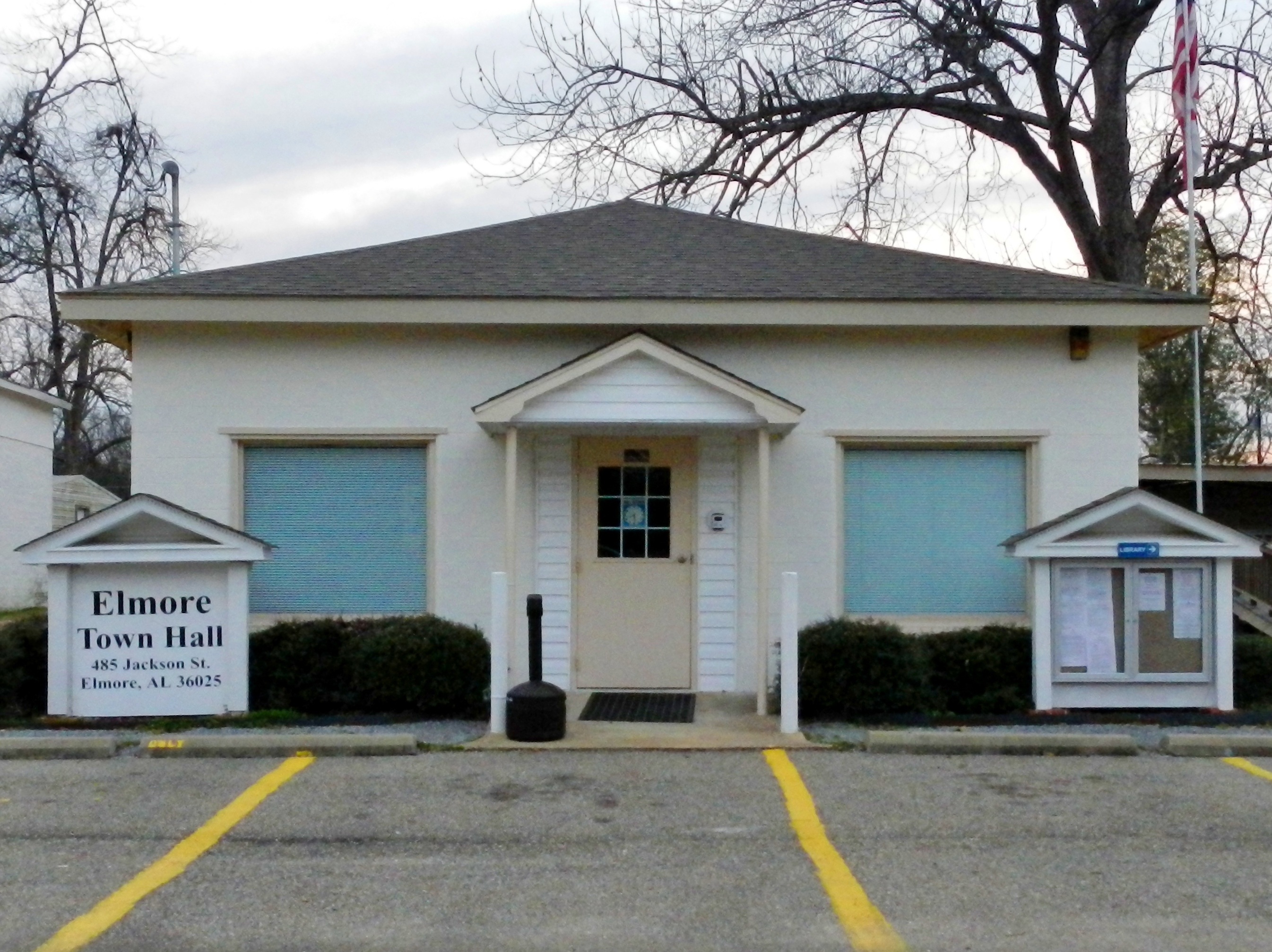
- Elmore Town Hall
- Motto: "Town of Light"
- Location of Elmore in Elmore County, Alabama.
- Coordinates: 32°33′42″N 86°21′35″W
- Country: United States
- State: Alabama
- County: Elmore

Area
  - Total: 6.41 sq mi (16.61 km^{2})
  - Land: 6.27 sq mi (16.25 km^{2})
  - Water: 0.14 sq mi (0.36 km^{2})
- Elevation: 262 ft (80 m)

Population (2020)
  - Total: 1,280
  - Density: 204.0/sq mi (78.77/km^{2})
- Time zone: UTC-6 (Central (CST))
  - Summer (DST): UTC-5 (CDT)
- ZIP code: 36025
- Area code: 334
- FIPS code: 01-23656
- GNIS feature ID: 2406444
- Website: townofelmore.com

Elmore is a town in Elmore County, Alabama, United States. Although initially incorporated in 1906, it lapsed and was not reincorporated again until 1997. As of the 2020 census, Elmore had a population of 1,280. It is part of the Montgomery Metropolitan Statistical Area.

== Geography ==
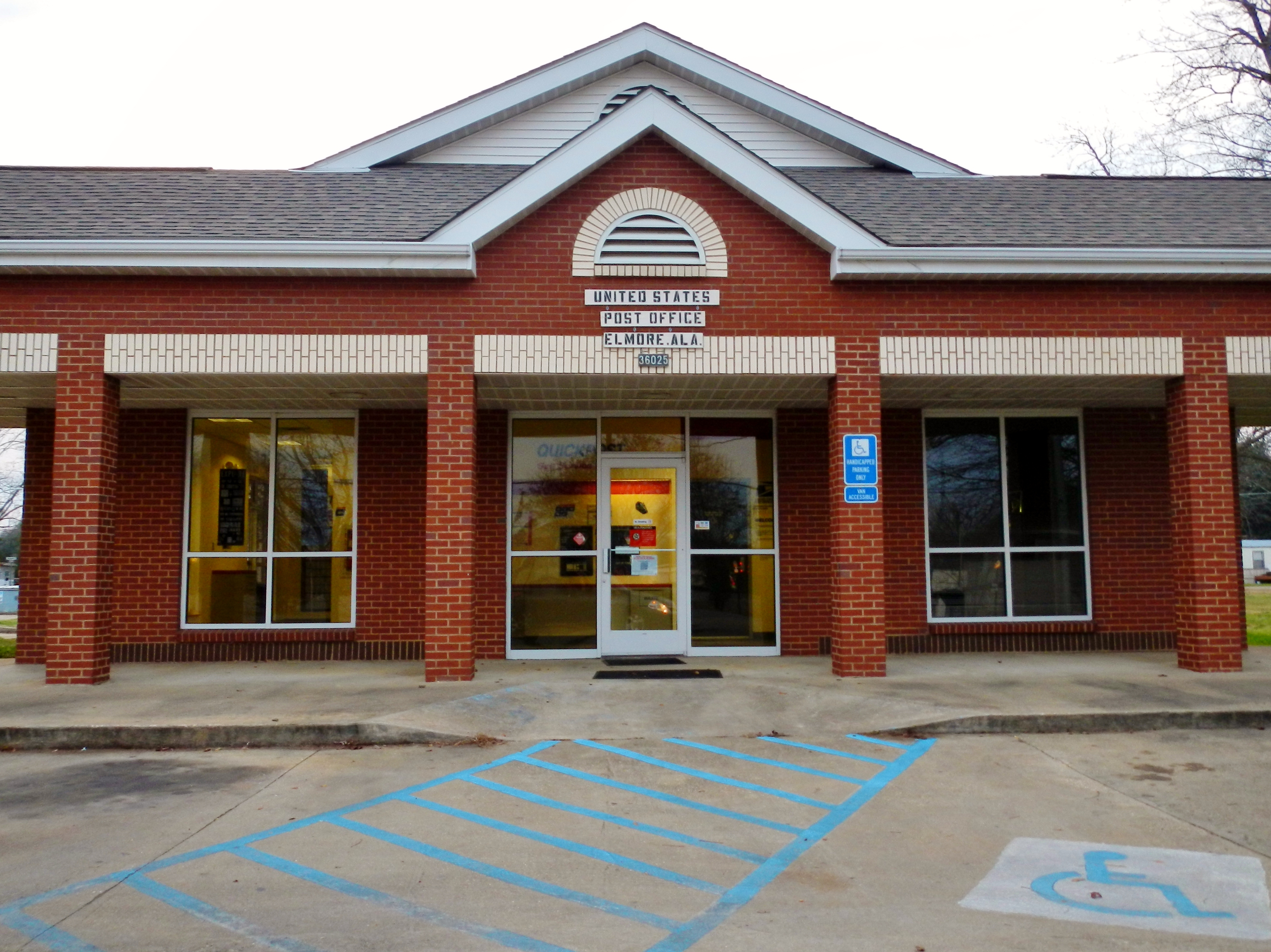
Elmore, Alabama Post Office (ZIP code 36025)

Elmore is located in western Elmore County. It is bordered to the west by Millbrook and to the south by Coosada. Alabama State Route 14 passes through the town, leading east 7 miles (11 km) to Wetumpka and west 10 miles (16 km) to Prattville. Montgomery, the state capital, is 15 miles (24 km) to the south via Cook Road and Coosada Parkway.

According to the U.S. Census Bureau, the town of Elmore has a total area of 4.0 square miles (10.4 km^{2}), of which 3.9 square miles (10.2 km^{2}) is land and 0.1 square miles (0.2 km^{2}), or 1.69%, is water.

== Demographics ==
Historical population
Census	Pop.	Note	%±
1880	106		—
2000	199		—
2010	1,262		534.2%
2020	1,280		1.4%
U.S. Decennial Census; 2013 Estimate

Note that community was listed on the 1880 U.S. Census as the unincorporated town of Elmore Station.

=== 2020 census ===
As of the 2020 census, Elmore had a population of 1,280. The median age was 35.5 years. 27.7% of residents were under the age of 18 and 14.8% of residents were 65 years of age or older. For every 100 females there were 87.1 males, and for every 100 females age 18 and over there were 81.6 males age 18 and over.

0.0% of residents lived in urban areas, while 100.0% lived in rural areas.

There were 435 households, including 268 families, in Elmore, of which 42.5% had children under the age of 18 living in them. Of all households, 35.9% were married-couple households, 17.5% were households with a male householder and no spouse or partner present, and 37.0% were households with a female householder and no spouse or partner present. About 22.3% of all households were made up of individuals and 8.0% had someone living alone who was 65 years of age or older.

There were 475 housing units, of which 8.4% were vacant. The homeowner vacancy rate was 2.2% and the rental vacancy rate was 4.9%.

Elmore racial composition
Race	Num.	Perc.
White (non-Hispanic)	777	60.7%
Black or African American (non-Hispanic)	356	27.81%
Native American	4	0.31%
Asian	8	0.63%
Other/Mixed	74	5.78%
Hispanic or Latino	61	4.77%

=== 2010 census ===
At the 2010 census there were 1,262 people, 423 households, and 331 families in the town. The population density was 1,802.9 inhabitants per square mile (696.1/km^{2}). There were 462 housing units at an average density of 660.0 per square mile (254.8/km^{2}). The racial makeup of the town was 64.3% White, 26.7% Black or African American, .1% Native American, 7.4% from other races, and 1.3% from two or more races. 8.8% of the population were Hispanic or Latino of any race. Of the 423 households 43.7% had children under the age of 18 living with them, 49.4% were married couples living together, 21.5% had a female householder with no husband present, and 21.7% were non-families. 18.0% of households were one person and 4.5% were one person aged 65 or older. The average household size was 2.98 and the average family size was 3.34.

The age distribution was 32.6% under the age of 18, 11.4% from 18 to 24, 29.6% from 25 to 44, 18.5% from 45 to 64, and 7.8% 65 or older. The median age was 29.1 years. For every 100 females, there were 92.7 males. For every 100 females age 18 and over, there were 96.2 males.

The median household income was $33,295 and the median family income was $36,354. Males had a median income of $37,667 versus $22,193 for females. The per capita income for the town was $17,139. About 20.7% of families and 20.3% of the population were below the poverty line, including 29.8% of those under the age of eighteen and 13.9% of those sixty five or over.

=== 2000 census ===
At the 2000 census there were 199 people, 77 households, and 55 families in the town. The population density was 302.9 inhabitants per square mile (117.0/km^{2}). There were 88 housing units at an average density of 134.0 per square mile (51.7/km^{2}). The racial makeup of the town was 67.84% White, 27.64% Black or African American, 1.51% Native American, 2.01% from other races, and 1.01% from two or more races. 1.51% of the population were Hispanic or Latino of any race. Of the 77 households 31.2% had children under the age of 18 living with them, 49.4% were married couples living together, 18.2% had a female householder with no husband present, and 27.3% were non-families. 23.4% of households were one person and 9.1% were one person aged 65 or older. The average household size was 2.58 and the average family size was 3.07.

The age distribution was 26.1% under the age of 18, 8.5% from 18 to 24, 32.7% from 25 to 44, 21.1% from 45 to 64, and 11.6% 65 or older. The median age was 34 years. For every 100 females, there were 89.5 males. For every 100 females age 18 and over, there were 98.6 males.

The median household income was $29,792 and the median family income was $32,500. Males had a median income of $30,179 versus $23,333 for females. The per capita income for the town was $13,533. About 11.7% of families and 20.5% of the population were below the poverty line, including 15.0% of those under the age of eighteen and 31.0% of those sixty five or over.

== Education ==
It is in the Elmore County Public School System.

Private schools:

- Edgewood Academy
