= Deatsville, Alabama =

- Town
- Location of Deatsville in Elmore County, Alabama.
- Coordinates: 32°35′06″N 86°22′56″W
- Country: United States
- State: Alabama
- County: Elmore

Area
  - Total: 4.84 sq mi (12.54 km^{2})
  - Land: 4.81 sq mi (12.46 km^{2})
  - Water: 0.031 sq mi (0.08 km^{2})
- Elevation: 404 ft (123 m)

Population (2020)
  - Total: 1,679
  - Density: 348.9/sq mi (134.72/km^{2})
- Time zone: UTC-6 (Central (CST))
  - Summer (DST): UTC-5 (CDT)
- ZIP code: 36022
- Area code: 334
- FIPS code: 01-20008
- GNIS feature ID: 2406364

Deatsville is a town in Elmore County, Alabama, United States. Although Deatsville initially incorporated in 1903, it lapsed at some point after the 1910 U.S. Census and did not appear again as incorporated until 2000. As of the 2020 census, the population was 1,679.

== Geography ==
Deatsville is located in western Elmore County and eastern Autauga County. It is bordered to the west by Autauga County and to the south by the city of Millbrook. Portions of the town also sit at the edge of Jordan Lake.

Alabama State Route 143 passes through the center of Deatsville, leading northwest 22 miles (35 km) to Clanton and southeast 8 miles (13 km) to Elmore. Montgomery, the state capital, is 23 miles (37 km) to the south.

According to the U.S. Census Bureau, Deatsville has a total area of 4.70 square miles (12.16 km^{2}), of which 4.66 square miles (12.08 km^{2}) is land and 0.03 square miles (0.08 km^{2}), or 0.67%, is water.

== Demographics ==
Historical population
Census	Pop.	Note	%±
1910	194		—
2000	340		—
2010	1,154		239.4%
2020	1,679		45.5%
U.S. Decennial Census; 2013 Estimate

=== 2020 census ===
As of the 2020 census, Deatsville had a population of 1,679. The median age was 35.8 years. 28.4% of residents were under the age of 18 and 9.4% of residents were 65 years of age or older. For every 100 females there were 104.8 males, and for every 100 females age 18 and over there were 99.8 males age 18 and over.

0.0% of residents lived in urban areas, while 100.0% lived in rural areas.

There were 570 households in Deatsville, of which 48.2% had children under the age of 18 living in them. Of all households, 69.5% were married-couple households, 12.3% were households with a male householder and no spouse or partner present, and 14.4% were households with a female householder and no spouse or partner present. About 11.9% of all households were made up of individuals and 3.5% had someone living alone who was 65 years of age or older.

There were 587 housing units, of which 2.9% were vacant. The homeowner vacancy rate was 1.7% and the rental vacancy rate was 6.7%.

Racial composition as of the 2020 census
Race	Number	Percent
White	1,116	66.5%
Black or African American	419	25.0%
American Indian and Alaska Native	1	0.1%
Asian	2	0.1%
Native Hawaiian and Other Pacific Islander	0	0.0%
Some other race	25	1.5%
Two or more races	116	6.9%
Hispanic or Latino (of any race)	51	3.0%

=== 2010 census ===
At the 2010 census there were 1,154 people, 328 households, and 190 families in the town. The population density was 250.9 inhabitants per square mile (96.9/km^{2}). There were 460 housing units at an average density of 100.0 per square mile (38.6/km^{2}). The racial makeup of the town was 77.6% White, 19.4% Black or African American, 0.3% from other races, and 2.3% from two or more races. Of the 328 households 48.6% had children under the age of 18 living with them, 71.9% were married couples living together, 8.4% had a female householder with no husband present, and 16.1% were non-families. 14.6% of households were one person and 5.9% were one person aged 65 or older. The average household size was 2.95 and the average family size was 3.28.

The age distribution was 32.9% under the age of 18, 6.1% from 18 to 24, 31.9% from 25 to 44, 22.5% from 45 to 64, and 6.6% 65 or older. The median age was 34 years. For every 100 females, there were 93.0 males. For every 100 females age 18 and over, there were 92.3 males.

The median household income was $59,853 and the median family income was $68,929. Males had a median income of $59,125 versus $26,250 for females. The per capita income for the town was $23,376. None of the families and 0.2% of the population were living below the poverty line, including no under eighteens and 0% of those over 64.

=== 2000 census ===
At the 2000 census there were 340 people, 130 households, and 101 families in the town. The population density was 73.2 inhabitants per square mile (28.3/km^{2}). There were 150 housing units at an average density of 32.3 per square mile (12.5/km^{2}). The racial makeup of the town was 97.35% White, 1.47% Black or African American, 0.59% from other races, and 0.59% from two or more races. Of the 130 households 33.8% had children under the age of 18 living with them, 70.0% were married couples living together, 3.8% had a female householder with no husband present, and 22.3% were non-families. 18.5% of households were one person and 10.0% were one person aged 65 or older. The average household size was 2.62 and the average family size was 2.99.

The age distribution was 24.4% under the age of 18, 6.8% from 18 to 24, 29.1% from 25 to 44, 25.9% from 45 to 64, and 13.8% 65 or older. The median age was 40 years. For every 100 females, there were 104.8 males. For every 100 females age 18 and over, there were 110.7 males.

The median household income was $40,938 and the median family income was $48,295. Males had a median income of $31,000 versus $21,875 for females. The per capita income for the town was $16,409. None of the families and 0.9% of the population were living below the poverty line, including no under eighteens and 3.4% of those over 64.

== Education ==
It is in the Elmore County Public School System.

== Notable people ==
- Dee Milliner, NFL Player
