= Wetumpka High School =

Location
- 1251 Coosa River Parkway; Wetumpka, Alabama 36092; United States; 32°33′09″N 86°13′22″W

Information
- Type: Public
- Established: 1897 (129 years ago)
- School district: Elmore County Public School System
- CEEB code: 012835
- Principal: Kyle Futral
- Staff: 64.00 (FTE)
- Grades: 9–12
- Enrollment: 1,225 (2023–2024)
- Student to teacher ratio: 19.14
- Colors: Gold, black, and white
- Athletics conference: 5A
- Team name: Indians
- Rival: Stanhope Elmore
- Website: whs.elmoreco.com

Wetumpka High School is a public high school in Wetumpka, Alabama, United States. It is one of four high schools in the Elmore County Public School System.

== History ==
Wetumpka High School was founded in 1897 as the 5th District Agricultural School. It became known as Wetumpka High School in 1932.

== Athletics ==
The following sports are offered at Wetumpka:

- Band
- Baseball
- Basketball
- Cheerleading
- Cross country
- Fishing
- Flag Running
- Football
- Golf
- Soccer
- Softball
- Tennis
- Track and field
- Volleyball
- Wrestling

== Notable alumni ==
- Luke Sewell, former Major League Baseball player, coach, and manager
- Jamie Winborn, former National Football League linebacker
- Lewis Jackson (basketball, born 1962), former Alabama State University Head Coach
