= Saman, Rewa =

Village

Coordinates: 24.549°N 81.327°E

Saman is a village in Gangev Tehsil Rewa district of Madhya Pradesh state in India.

Its pin Code is 486005 and its postal head office is in Bansagar. There is also a Saman village in Beohari tehsil, in Shahdol district.
