= Seman, Alabama =

Unincorporated community in Alabama, United States

- Unincorporated community
- Location within Alabama Location within the United States
- Coordinates: 32°43′57″N 86°06′44″W
- Country: United States
- State: Alabama
- County: Elmore
- Elevation: 732 ft (223 m)
- Time zone: UTC-6 (Central (CST))
  - Summer (DST): UTC-5 (CDT)
- Area code: 334
- GNIS feature ID: 126544

Seman is an unincorporated community located in Elmore County, Alabama, United States, located along Alabama State Route 9, 9.6 miles (15.4 km) north-northwest of Eclectic.

== History ==
Seman is most likely named for the Seman family, who were early settlers of the area. A post office operated under the name Seman from 1902 to 1968.

== Notable person ==
- James F. Blake, bus driver whom Rosa Parks defied in 1955, prompting the Montgomery bus boycott
