= Shaman-Gora =

Archaeological site in the Russian Far East

- View of Shaman-Gora in the summer

- Location within Zabaykalsky Krai
- 50°59′30″N 110°47′11″E
- Type: Ritual site
- Location: Khiloksky District
- Region: Zabaykalsky Krai

History
- Built: Approximately 4000–1000 BCE

Shaman-Gora (Russian: Шаман-Гора) is an archeological site on the outskirts of the village of Duty in Khiloksky District of Zabaykalsky Krai. It is famous for its about 100 petroglyphs dating from 4000–1000 BCE. It is thought to be a ritual site for the local tribes. There are two main strata and their artifacts show that there was a highly developed society in the region at the confluence of the Duty River and Arey Rivers.

== History of research ==
The site was discovered in 1996 by the Chikoy Archaeological Expedition led by Mikhail Konstantinov. The archaeological complex comprises five separate areas containing rock art.
