= Coosada, Alabama =

Town in Elmore County, Alabama, United States

- Town
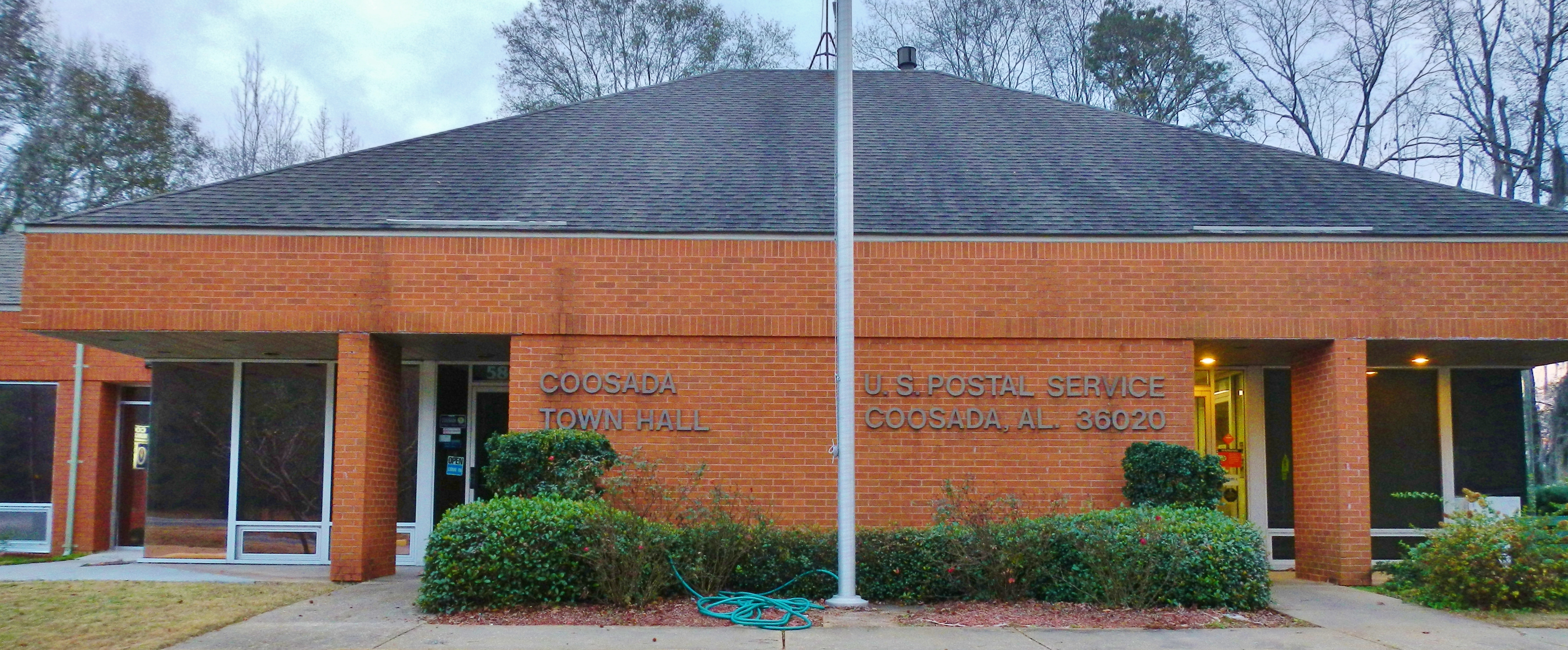
- Coosada town hall and post office

- Seal

- Location of Coosada in Elmore County, Alabama.
- Coordinates: 32°30′24″N 86°19′41″W
- Country: United States
- State: Alabama
- County: Elmore
- Established: 1967

Area
  - Total: 7.14 sq mi (18.48 km^{2})
  - Land: 6.90 sq mi (17.86 km^{2})
  - Water: 0.24 sq mi (0.62 km^{2})
- Elevation: 174 ft (53 m)

Population (2020)
  - Total: 1,217
  - Density: 176.5/sq mi (68.16/km^{2})
- Time zone: UTC-6 (Central (CST))
  - Summer (DST): UTC-5 (CDT)
- ZIP code: 36020
- Area code: 334
- FIPS code: 01-17176
- GNIS feature ID: 2406310
- Website: coosadaal.gov

Coosada is a town in Elmore County, Alabama, United States. At the 2020 census, its population was 1,217. It is part of the Montgomery metropolitan statistical area.

== History ==
Coosawda was home to a Creek (Coushatta tribe) village called Koasati in the 18th and early 19th centuries. By invitation, many Chickamauga Cherokee followers of Dragging Canoe fled to the town during and following the American War of Independence. Coosada was the birthplace of influential Creek leader William Weatherford, who led the Red Stick uprising of 1813–1814. After that, the Native American population was removed to the west.

Frontiersmen from the United States quickly settled in the area. The future governor of the state of Alabama, William Wyatt Bibb, migrated to the area at that time. A land speculator from Georgia, he purchased the land that the village of Koasati occupied, and subdivided it into lots for sale. By 1818, the town had a post office and a sawmill. Following the establishment of the train depot in 1872, the settlement was called "Coosada Station". The new spelling of "Coosada" came about when the maker of the depot sign left off the "w" in error. Around 1890, the town became simply Coosada.

== Geography ==
Coosada is situated along the Alabama River. According to the U.S. Census Bureau, the town has a total area of 7.3 square miles (19 km^{2}), of which 0.2 sq mi (0.52 km^{2}) (3.37%) is covered by water.

== Demographics ==
Historical population
Census	Pop.	Note	%±
1880	45		—
1970	240		—
1980	980		308.3%
1990	912		−6.9%
2000	1,382		51.5%
2010	1,224		−11.4%
2020	1,217		−0.6%
U.S. Decennial Census; 2013 Estimate

Note: The 1880 U.S. Census figure is for the unincorporated community of Coosada Station. Coosada was not incorporated until 1967.

=== 2020 census ===
As of the 2020 census, Coosada had a population of 1,217. The median age was 41.4 years; 21.8% of residents were under 18 and 18.7% were 65 age or older. For every 100 females, there were 93.5 males, and for every 100 females 18 and over, there were 88.9 males 18 and over.

About 28.6% of residents lived in urban areas, while 71.4% lived in rural areas.

The 477 households in Coosada included 322 families. Of all households, 34.4% had children under 18 living in them, 48.8% were married-couple households, 18.0% were households with a male householder and no spouse or partner present, and 28.1% were households with a female householder and no spouse or partner present. About 23.7% of all households were made up of individuals, and 11.1% had someone living alone who was 65 age or older.

Of the 514 housing units, 7.2% were vacant. The homeowner vacancy rate was 0.0% and the rental vacancy rate was 6.7%.

Coosada racial composition
Race	Number	Percentage
White (non-Hispanic)	678	55.71%
Black or African American (non-Hispanic)	445	36.57%
Native American	6	0.49%
Asian	2	0.16%
Multiracial or some other race	35	2.88%
Hispanic or Latino	51	4.19%

=== 2010 census ===
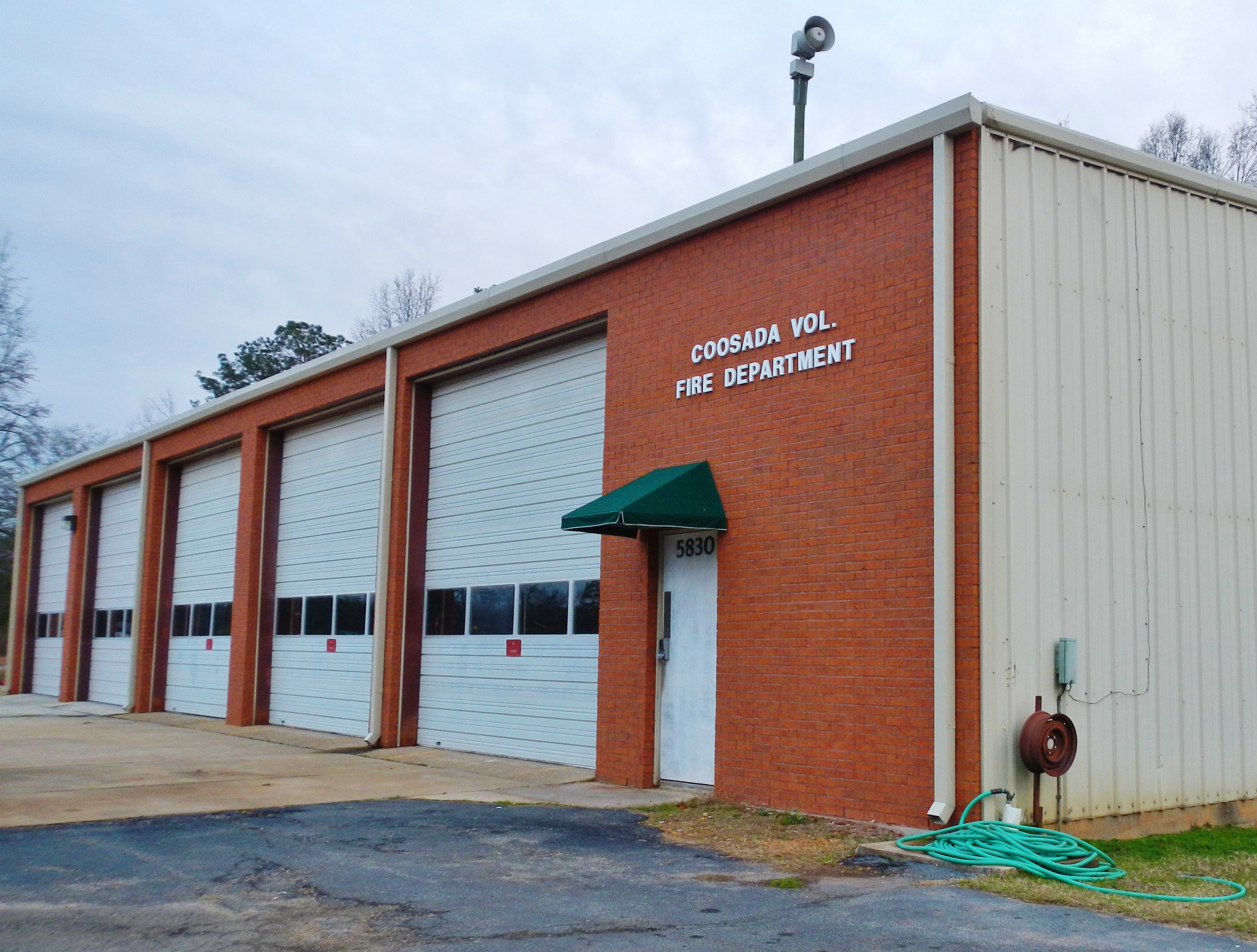
Coosada volunteer fire department

At the 2010 census, 1,224 people, 434 households, and 340 families were in the town. The population density was 172.3 inhabitants per square mile (66.5/km^{2}). The 487 housing units had an average density of 66.7 units per square mile (25.8 units/km^{2}). The racial makeup of the town was 57.7% White, 40.0% Black or African American, 0.4% Native American, 0.2% Asian, 1.1% from other races, and 0.7% from two or more races; 2.9% of the population was Hispanic or Latino of any race. Of the 472 households, 32.0% had children under 18 living with them, 54.4% were married couples living together, 17.7% had a female householder with no husband present, and 21.7% were not families. About 18.9% of households were one person, and 8.5% were one person 65 or older. The average household size was 2.82, and the average family size was 3.19. The age distribution was 27.0% under 18, 8.0% from 18 to 24, 24.3% from 25 to 44, 27.2% from 45 to 64, and 13.6% were 65 or older. The median age was 38.1 years. For every 100 females, there were 96.5 males. For every 100 females 18 and over, there were 98.4 males. The median household income was $47,904 and the median family income was $53,462. Males had a median income of $41,336 versus $24,659 for females. The per capita income for the town was $18,636. About 10.6% of families and 15.5% of the population were below the poverty line, including 18.8% of those under 18 and 12.7% of those 65 or over.

=== 2000 census ===
At the 2000 census, 1,382 people, 472 households, and 370 families resided in the town. The population density was 196.1 inhabitants per square mile (75.7/km^{2}). The 529 housing units had an average density of 75.1 units per square mile (29.0 units/km^{2}). The racial makeup of the town was 56.08% White, 42.55% Black or African American, 0.36% Native American, 0.14% Asian, 0.22% from other races, and 0.65% from two or more races. About 0.65% of the population was Hispanic or Latino of any race. Of the 472 households 39.0% had children under the age of 18 living with them, 58.3% were married couples living together, 15.0% had a female householder with no husband present, and 21.6% were not families; 19.3% of households were one person and 7.8% were one person 65 or older. The average household size was 2.93, and the average family size was 3.38. The age distribution was 31.9% under 18, 8.2% from 18 to 24, 29.1% from 25 to 44, 20.5% from 45 to 64, and 10.3% 65 or older. The median age was 32 years. For every 100 females, there were 95.8 males. For every 100 females 18 and over, there were 90.1 males. The median income was $39,405 for a household and $44,118 for a family. Males had a median income of $30,444 versus $22,411 for females. The per capita income for the town was $16,219. About 7.7% of families and 10.9% of the population were below the poverty line, including 17.4% of those under 18 and 11.7% of those 65 or over.

== Education ==
Coosada is in the Elmore County Public School System service area.

== Notable people ==
- William Wyatt Bibb, the first governor of Alabama, is buried in the Bibb family cemetery just outside of Coosada.
- George G. McWhorter, member of the Florida Supreme Court from 1885 to 1887
- William Weatherford, Creek chief, born near Coosada.
