= Holtville, Alabama =

- Census-designated place
- Location of Holtville in Elmore County, Alabama.
- Coordinates: 32°37′55″N 86°19′46″W
- Country: United States
- State: Alabama
- County: Elmore

Area
  - Total: 25.18 sq mi (65.22 km^{2})
  - Land: 21.59 sq mi (55.91 km^{2})
  - Water: 3.59 sq mi (9.31 km^{2})
- Elevation: 331 ft (101 m)

Population (2020)
  - Total: 4,940
  - Density: 228.9/sq mi (88.36/km^{2})
- Time zone: UTC-6 (Central (CST))
  - Summer (DST): UTC-5 (CDT)
- Area code: 334
- GNIS feature ID: 2582683

Holtville (also Slapout) is a census-designated place and unincorporated community in Elmore County, Alabama, United States. Its population was 4,940 as of the 2020 census.

Holtville/Slapout is located on the western bank of Jordan Lake, and much of its population lives along this lakeshore, or in the neighboring Lightwood community.

According to tradition, the old name of Slapout was derived from a storekeeper's way of stating an item was out of stock: he was "slap out of it".

== Demographics ==
Historical population
Census	Pop.	Note	%±
2010	4,096		—
2020	4,940		20.6%
U.S. Decennial Census

Holtville was listed as a census designated place in the 2010 U.S. census.

=== Racial and ethnic composition ===
Holtville CDP, Alabama – Racial and ethnic composition Note: the US Census treats Hispanic/Latino as an ethnic category. This table excludes Latinos from the racial categories and assigns them to a separate category. Hispanics/Latinos may be of any race.
Race / Ethnicity (NH = Non-Hispanic)	Pop 2010	Pop 2020	% 2010	% 2020
White alone (NH)	3,672	4,255	89.65%	86.13%
Black or African American alone (NH)	302	317	7.37%	6.42%
Native American or Alaska Native alone (NH)	19	21	0.46%	0.43%
Asian alone (NH)	10	31	0.24%	0.63%
Native Hawaiian or Pacific Islander alone (NH)	1	2	0.02%	0.04%
Other race alone (NH)	5	9	0.12%	0.18%
Mixed race or Multiracial (NH)	35	203	0.85%	4.11%
Hispanic or Latino (any race)	52	102	1.27%	2.06%
Total	4,096	4,940	100.00%	100.00%

=== 2020 census ===
As of the 2020 census, Holtville had a population of 4,940. The median age was 39.0 years. 25.3% of residents were under the age of 18 and 14.8% of residents were 65 years of age or older. For every 100 females there were 93.8 males, and for every 100 females age 18 and over there were 94.8 males age 18 and over.

0.0% of residents lived in urban areas, while 100.0% lived in rural areas.

There were 1,871 households in Holtville, of which 35.0% had children under the age of 18 living in them. Of all households, 60.5% were married-couple households, 16.1% were households with a male householder and no spouse or partner present, and 19.6% were households with a female householder and no spouse or partner present. About 21.3% of all households were made up of individuals and 8.7% had someone living alone who was 65 years of age or older.

There were 2,116 housing units, of which 11.6% were vacant. The homeowner vacancy rate was 1.4% and the rental vacancy rate was 3.8%.

== Education ==
Holtville/Slapout is in the Elmore County Public School System, served by Holtville Elementary, Middle, and High Schools with a combined enrollment of 1947 students in 2023.

== Notable people ==
- Jessica Meuse, contestant on the thirteenth season of American Idol.
- Randy Nix, a Republican member of the Georgia House of Representatives for the 69th district.
- Kirby Smart, Head football coach, University of Georgia.

== In popular culture ==
Holtville was the subject of a 1945 film by The United States Information Agency that highlighted how a rural community can overcome poverty and poor soil through education and commitment.".

== See also ==
- Slapout, Oklahoma
