= Seman, Iran =

Seman سمان
- Village
- Location within Iran
- Coordinates: 35°07′04″N 47°05′24″E
- Country: Iran
- Province: Kurdistan
- County: Sanandaj
- Bakhsh: Central
- Rural District: Naran

Population (2006)
  - Total: 98
- Time zone: UTC+3:30 (IRST)
  - Summer (DST): UTC+4:30 (IRDT)

Seman (Persian: سمان, also Romanized as Semān and Samān) is a village in Naran Rural District, in the Central District of Sanandaj County, Kurdistan Province, Iran. At the 2006 census, its population was 98, in 25 families. The village is populated by Kurds.
