= Redland, Alabama =

- Census-designated place
- Location of Redland in Elmore County, Alabama.
- Coordinates: 32°29′43″N 86°07′38″W
- Country: United States
- State: Alabama
- County: Elmore

Area
  - Total: 24.42 sq mi (63.26 km^{2})
  - Land: 24.13 sq mi (62.49 km^{2})
  - Water: 0.30 sq mi (0.77 km^{2})
- Elevation: 272 ft (83 m)

Population (2020)
  - Total: 5,106
  - Density: 211.6/sq mi (81.71/km^{2})
- Time zone: UTC-6 (Central (CST))
  - Summer (DST): UTC-5 (CDT)
- Area code: 334
- GNIS feature ID: 2582696

Redland is a census-designated place in Elmore County, Alabama, United States. Its population was 5,106 at the 2020 census.

== Demographics ==
Historical population
Census	Pop.	Note	%±
2010	3,736		—
2020	5,106		36.7%
U.S. Decennial Census

Redland was listed as a census designated place in the 2010 U.S. census.

=== Racial and ethnic composition ===
Redland CDP, Alabama – Racial and ethnic composition Note: the US Census treats Hispanic/Latino as an ethnic category. This table excludes Latinos from the racial categories and assigns them to a separate category. Hispanics/Latinos may be of any race.
Race / Ethnicity (NH = Non-Hispanic)	Pop 2010	Pop 2020	% 2010	% 2020
White alone (NH)	3,035	3,830	81.24%	75.01%
Black or African American alone (NH)	478	850	12.79%	16.65%
Native American or Alaska Native alone (NH)	12	14	0.32%	0.27%
Asian alone (NH)	60	76	1.61%	1.49%
Native Hawaiian or Pacific Islander alone (NH)	2	2	0.05%	0.04%
Other race alone (NH)	10	8	0.27%	0.16%
Mixed race or Multiracial (NH)	53	190	1.42%	3.72%
Hispanic or Latino (any race)	86	136	2.30%	2.66%
Total	3,736	5,106	100.00%	100.00%

=== 2020 census ===
As of the 2020 census, Redland had a population of 5,106. The median age was 40.7 years. 24.3% of residents were under the age of 18 and 16.6% of residents were 65 years of age or older. For every 100 females there were 95.9 males, and for every 100 females age 18 and over there were 95.0 males age 18 and over.

0.0% of residents lived in urban areas, while 100.0% lived in rural areas.

There were 1,869 households in Redland, of which 33.1% had children under the age of 18 living in them. Of all households, 70.5% were married-couple households, 11.1% were households with a male householder and no spouse or partner present, and 15.4% were households with a female householder and no spouse or partner present. About 17.5% of all households were made up of individuals and 8.4% had someone living alone who was 65 years of age or older.

There were 1,946 housing units, of which 4.0% were vacant. The homeowner vacancy rate was 1.4% and the rental vacancy rate was 8.1%.

== Education ==
Redland is in the Elmore County Public School System.
