= Jordan Lake (Alabama) =

Lake in Alabama

Lake Jordan
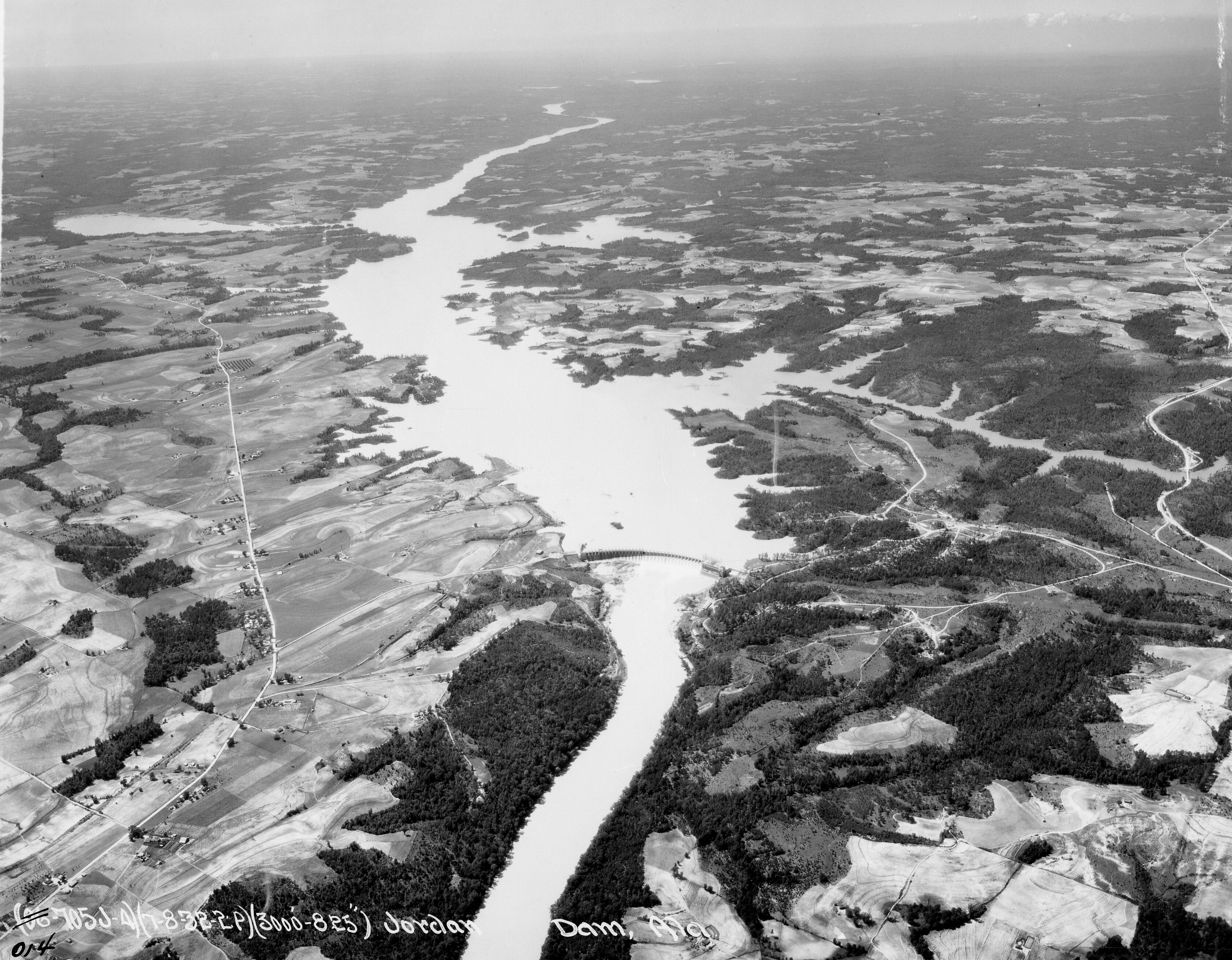
- Jordan Lake with dam in foreground, 1932

- Location within Alabama Location within the United States
- Location: Elmore County, Alabama, United States
- Coordinates: 32°37′08″N 86°15′27″W
- River sources: Coosa River
- Max. length: 18 miles (29 km)
- Surface area: 6,800 acres (28 km^{2})
- Water volume: 236,200 acre⋅ft (291,300,000 m^{3})
- Shore length^{1}: 188 miles (303 km)
- ^{1} Shore length is not a well-defined measure.

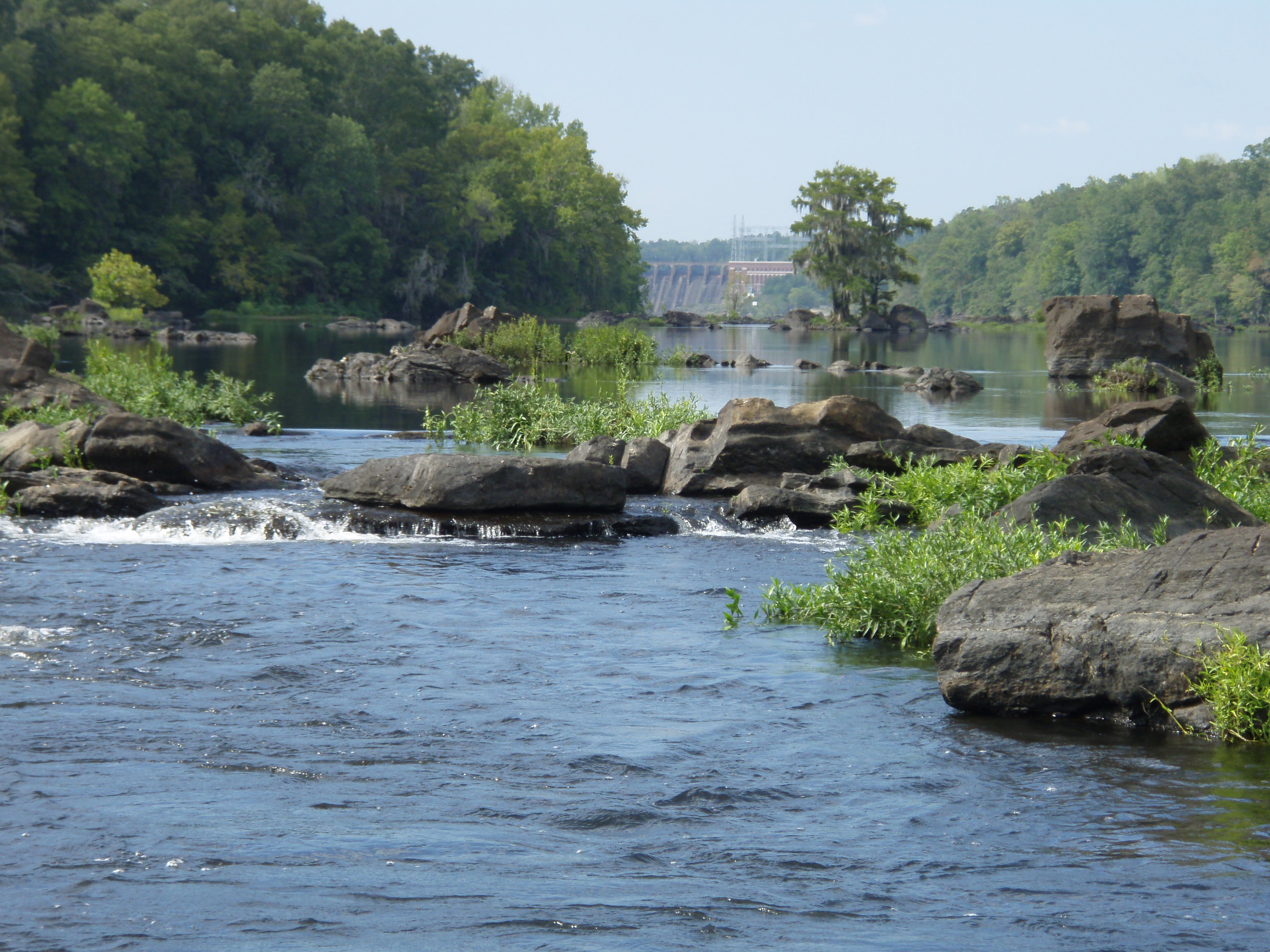
Jordan Dam in background

Jordan JUR-dən Lake is a lake in Elmore County, Alabama. The closest city is Wetumpka.

Jordan Lake is a reservoir with a water surface of 6,800 acres (28 km^{2}), shoreline of about 188 miles (303 km), a total length of 18 miles (29 km), and a maximum storage volume of 236,200 acre-feet (291,300,000 m^{3}). It is a recreational lake with fishing opportunities for largemouth bass, spotted bass, bluegill and other sunfish, crappie, catfish, striped bass, and white bass. The lake has two public access sites.

Owned and operated by Alabama Power, the lake was impounded December 31, 1928. Jordan Dam is a concrete arch dam, 125 feet (38 m) high, built for hydropower generation with a 100 megawatt generating capacity.

== Gallery ==
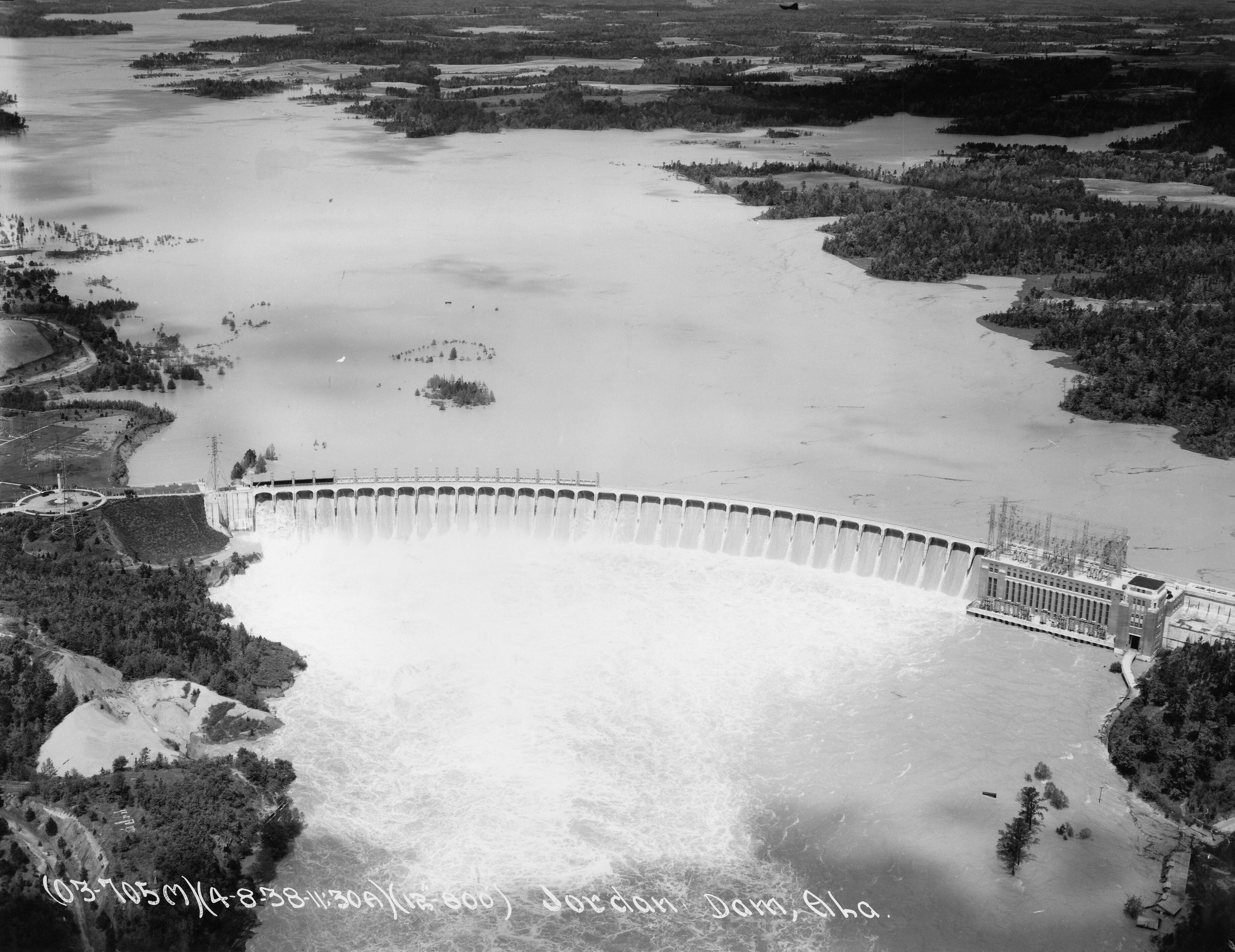
Dam in 1938

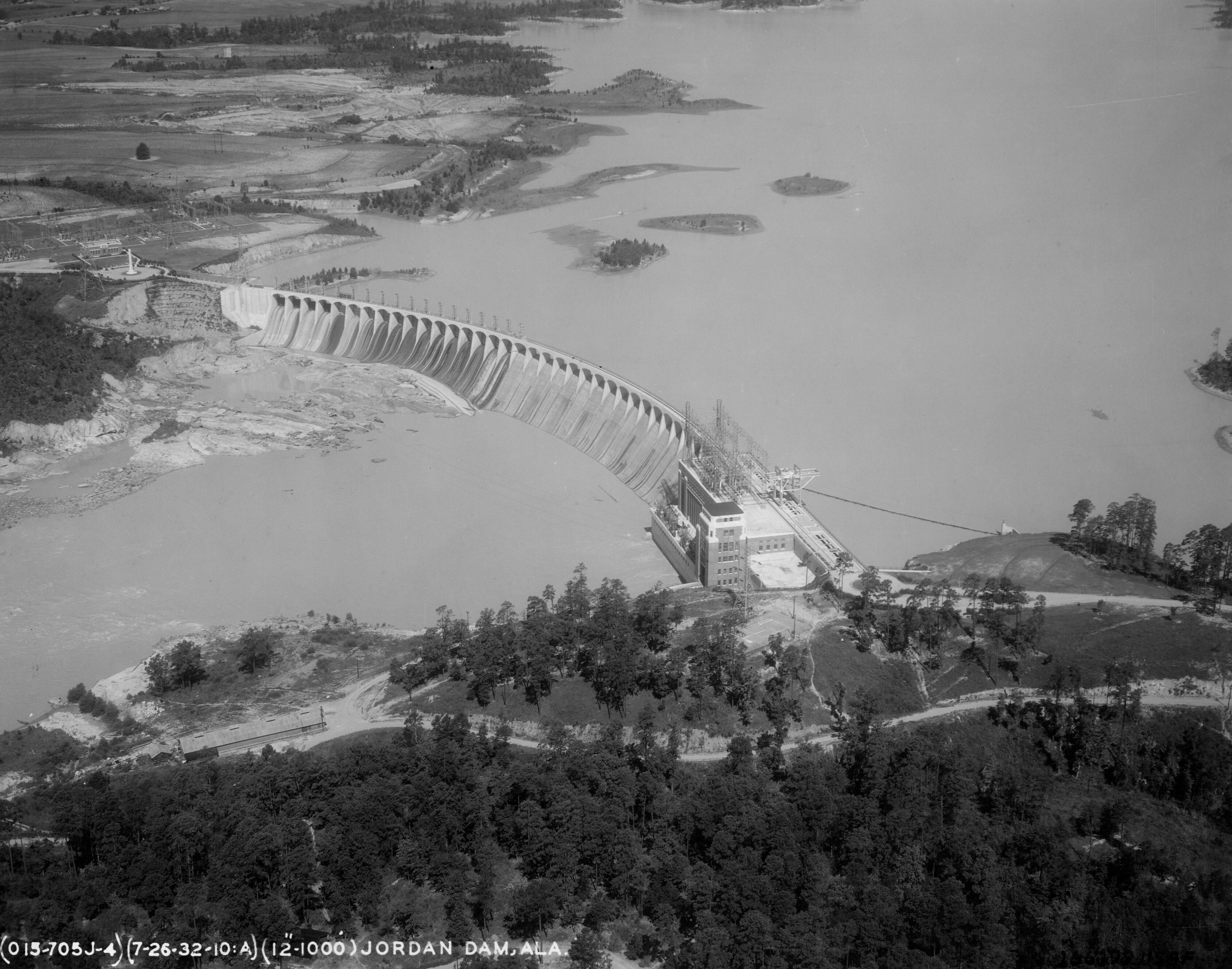
Dam in 1932
