= Elmore County, Alabama =

County in Alabama, United States

- County
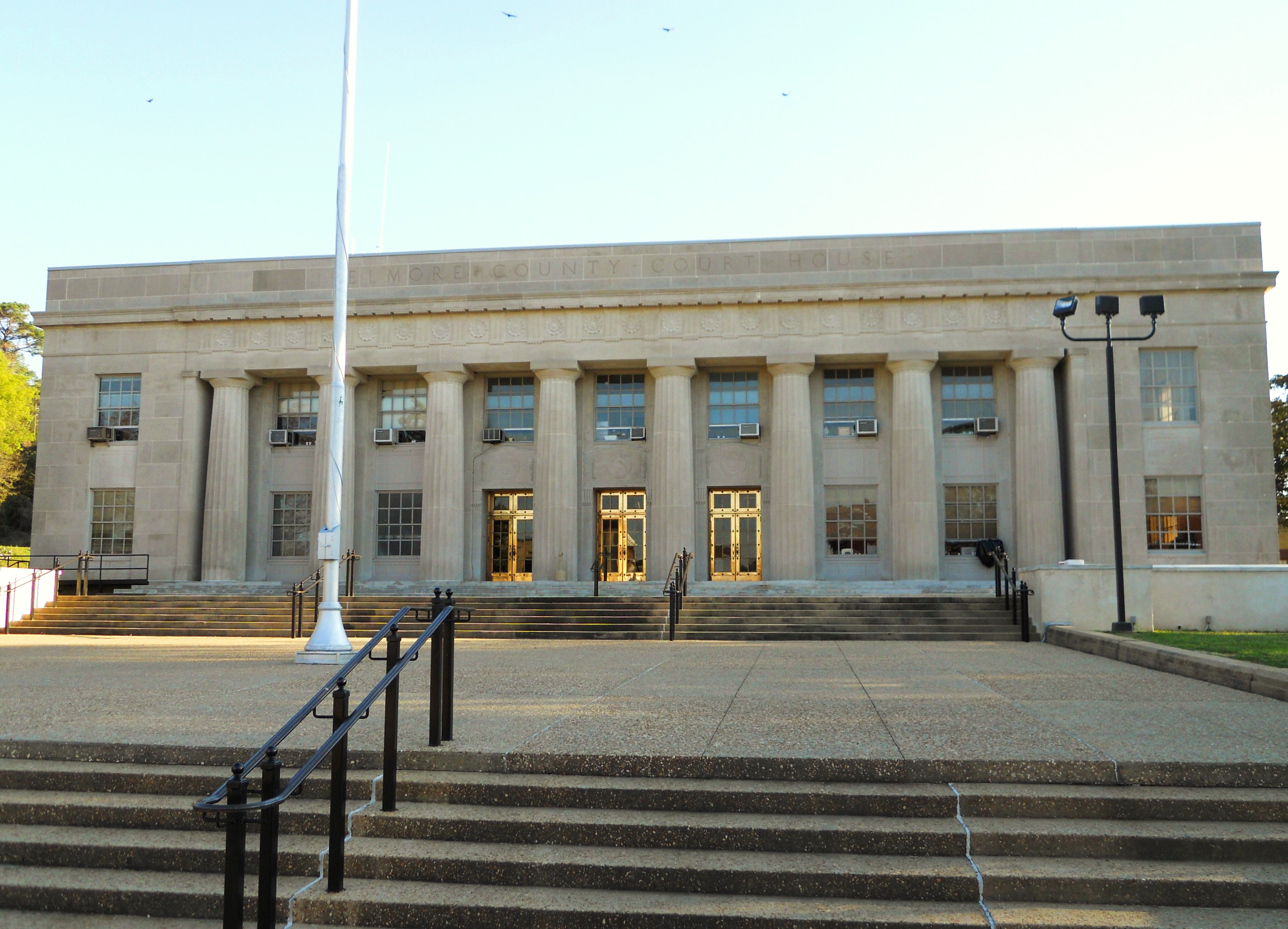
- Elmore County Courthouse in Wetumpka

- Seal

- Location within the U.S. state of Alabama
- Coordinates: 32°35′49″N 86°09′05″W
- Country: United States
- State: Alabama
- Founded: February 15, 1866
- Named for: John A. Elmore
- Seat: Wetumpka
- Largest city: Millbrook

Area
  - Total: 657 sq mi (1,700 km^{2})
  - Land: 618 sq mi (1,600 km^{2})
  - Water: 39 sq mi (100 km^{2}) 5.9%

Population (2020)
  - Total: 87,977
  - Estimate (2025): 91,577 ▲
  - Density: 142/sq mi (55.0/km^{2})
- Demonym: Elmorean
- Time zone: UTC−6 (Central)
  - Summer (DST): UTC−5 (CDT)
- Congressional district: 6th
- Website: www.elmoreco.org
- County Number 29 on Alabama Licence Plates

Elmore County is a county located in the east central portion of the U.S. state of Alabama. As of the 2020 census, the population was 87,977. Its county seat is Wetumpka. Its name is in honor of General John A. Elmore.

Elmore County is part of the Montgomery metropolitan area.

== History ==
Elmore County was established on February 15, 1866, from portions of Autauga, Coosa, Tallapoosa, and Montgomery counties.

The French established Fort Toulouse at the confluence of the Coosa and Tallapoosa in 1717.

Gen. Andrew Jackson then erected Fort Jackson in 1814 at the site of Fort Toulouse following the Battle of Horseshoe Bend.

On July 2, 1901, a local mob lynched Robert (or perhaps Robin) White. In a strange turn of events, a local farmer, George Howard confessed in court to the killing and named five other local men as killers. Three men were convicted in the killing and sentenced to ten years in prison. On June 9, 1902, they were pardoned by Governor Jelks. In 1915 another Black man was taken from the local jail and murdered.

In 1950, a City Planning Board was formed in the county seat of Wetumpka.

In 1957, the National Guard Armory was constructed in the county seat of Wetumpka.

== Geography ==
According to the United States Census Bureau, the county has a total area of 657 square miles (1,700 km^{2}), of which 618 square miles (1,600 km^{2}) is land and 39 square miles (100 km^{2}) (5.9%) is water.

The county is located on the fall line of the eastern United States, and consequently boasts a diverse geography. Most of the county contains rolling hills, being located in the Piedmont region. Some parts of the county do have open fields and farmland as well. The cities of Wetumpka and Tallassee are important river cities located on the fall line.

=== Major highways ===
- Interstate 65
- U.S. Highway 82 / State Route 6 (unsigned)
- U.S. Highway 231 / State Route 21 / State Route 53 (unsigned)
- State Route 9
- State Route 14
- State Route 50
- State Route 63
- State Route 111
- State Route 143
- State Route 170
- State Route 212
- State Route 229

=== Adjacent counties ===
- Coosa County (north)
- Tallapoosa County (northeast)
- Macon County (southeast)
- Montgomery County (south)
- Autauga County (west)
- Chilton County (northwest)

== Demographics ==
Historical population
Census	Pop.	Note	%±
1870	14,477		—
1880	17,502		20.9%
1890	21,732		24.2%
1900	26,099		20.1%
1910	28,245		8.2%
1920	28,085		−0.6%
1930	34,280		22.1%
1940	34,546		0.8%
1950	31,649		−8.4%
1960	30,524		−3.6%
1970	33,661		10.3%
1980	43,390		28.9%
1990	49,210		13.4%
2000	65,874		33.9%
2010	79,303		20.4%
2020	87,977		10.9%
2025 (est.)	91,577	▲	4.1%
U.S. Decennial Census; 1790–1960 1900–1990; 1990–2000 2010–2020

=== 2020 census ===
As of the 2020 census, the county had a population of 87,977. The median age was 40.7 years. 21.6% of residents were under the age of 18 and 16.7% of residents were 65 years of age or older. For every 100 females there were 101.7 males, and for every 100 females age 18 and over there were 100.3 males age 18 and over.

The racial makeup of the county was 71.8% White, 20.7% Black or African American, 0.4% American Indian and Alaska Native, 0.8% Asian, 0.0% Native Hawaiian and Pacific Islander, 1.5% from some other race, and 4.8% from two or more races. Hispanic or Latino residents of any race comprised 3.2% of the population.

28.8% of residents lived in urban areas, while 71.2% lived in rural areas.

There were 32,567 households in the county, of which 31.9% had children under the age of 18 living with them and 26.6% had a female householder with no spouse or partner present. About 24.9% of all households were made up of individuals and 10.5% had someone living alone who was 65 years of age or older.

There were 36,818 housing units, of which 11.5% were vacant. Among occupied housing units, 76.0% were owner-occupied and 24.0% were renter-occupied. The homeowner vacancy rate was 1.5% and the rental vacancy rate was 6.5%.

=== 2010 census ===
At the 2010 census there were 79,303 people, 28,301 households, and 21,003 families living in the county. The population density was 128 people per square mile (49 people/km^{2}). There were 32,657 housing units at an average density of 49.7 units per square mile (19.2 units/km^{2}). The racial makeup of the county was 76.2% White, 20.0% Black or African American, 0.4% Native American, 0.7% Asian, 0.1% Pacific Islander, 1.2% from other races, and 1.4% from two or more races. 2.7% of the population were Hispanic or Latino of any race. Of the 28,301 households 32.5% had children under the age of 18 living with them, 56.6% were married couples living together, 13.1% had a female householder with no husband present, and 25.8% were non-families. 22.0% of households were one person and 7.8% were one person aged 65 or older. The average household size was 2.61 and the average family size was 3.04.

The age distribution was 23.6% under the age of 18, 9.3% from 18 to 24, 27.9% from 25 to 44, 27.4% from 45 to 64, and 11.9% 65 or older. The median age was 37.8 years. For every 100 females, there were 95.3 males. For every 100 females age 18 and over, there were 94.7 males.

The median household income was $53,128 and the median family income was $62,870. Males had a median income of $46,952 versus $31,542 for females. The per capita income for the county was $22,640. About 9.1% of families and 12.4% of the population were below the poverty line, including 16.8% of those under age 18 and 9.4% of those age 65 or over.

=== 2000 census ===
At the 2000 census there were 65,874 people, 22,737 households, and 17,552 families living in the county. The population density was 106 people per square mile (41 people/km^{2}). There were 25,733 housing units at an average density of 41 units per square mile (16 units/km^{2}). The racial makeup of the county was 77.02% White, 20.64% Black or African American, 0.43% Native American, 0.36% Asian, 0.03% Pacific Islander, 0.48% from other races, and 1.04% from two or more races. 1.22% of the population were Hispanic or Latino of any race. Of the 22,737 households 37.40% had children under the age of 18 living with them, 61.40% were married couples living together, 12.00% had a female householder with no husband present, and 22.80% were non-families. 20.00% of households were one person and 7.70% were one person aged 65 or older. The average household size was 2.66 and the average family size was 3.07.

The age distribution was 25.70% under the age of 18, 8.80% from 18 to 24, 32.10% from 25 to 44, 22.70% from 45 to 64, and 10.70% 65 or older. The median age was 35 years. For every 100 females, there were 102.50 males. For every 100 females age 18 and over, there were 101.30 males.

The median household income was $41,243 and the median family income was $47,155. Males had a median income of $32,643 versus $24,062 for females. The per capita income for the county was $17,650. About 7.40% of families and 10.20% of the population were below the poverty line, including 14.20% of those under age 18 and 11.30% of those age 65 or over. In the late 1990s, voters voted to pass a mandatory fire fee for volunteer fire services. All citizens pay this same fee regardless of valuation of the property or income levels.

== Government and infrastructure ==
The Julia Tutwiler Prison for Women of the Alabama Department of Corrections is in Wetumpka in Elmore County. The prison houses Alabama's female death row. Wetumpka was previously the site of the Wetumpka State Penitentiary.

Politically, Elmore County is heavily Republican. It last voted Democratic for Jimmy Carter in 1976, which incidentally was also the last time a Democrat carried Alabama at the presidential level.

United States presidential election results for Elmore County, Alabama
Year	Republican		Democratic		Third party(ies)	
Year	No.	%	No.	%	No.	%
1868	1,262	51.32%	1,197	48.68%	0	0.00%
1872	1,564	54.44%	1,309	45.56%	0	0.00%
1876	1,249	47.17%	1,399	52.83%	0	0.00%
1880	1,389	48.41%	1,467	51.13%	13	0.45%
1884	1,141	43.47%	1,452	55.31%	32	1.22%
1888	1,535	47.20%	1,717	52.80%	0	0.00%
1892	84	2.18%	1,258	32.68%	2,507	65.13%
1896	1,379	39.78%	1,923	55.47%	165	4.76%
1900	1,104	36.33%	1,773	58.34%	162	5.33%
1904	151	10.67%	1,226	86.64%	38	2.69%
1908	138	11.23%	1,063	86.49%	28	2.28%
1912	81	5.74%	1,152	81.70%	177	12.55%
1916	0	0.00%	1,631	99.57%	7	0.43%
1920	353	16.64%	1,762	83.07%	6	0.28%
1924	219	16.43%	1,088	81.62%	26	1.95%
1928	1,770	57.45%	1,309	42.49%	2	0.06%
1932	160	4.39%	3,198	87.83%	283	7.77%
1936	182	4.24%	3,967	92.32%	148	3.44%
1940	144	3.26%	4,267	96.54%	9	0.20%
1944	184	5.58%	3,108	94.32%	3	0.09%
1948	167	6.50%	0	0.00%	2,403	93.50%
1952	1,315	23.83%	4,199	76.10%	4	0.07%
1956	1,619	30.01%	3,353	62.16%	422	7.82%
1960	1,919	35.48%	3,440	63.60%	50	0.92%
1964	6,363	83.77%	0	0.00%	1,233	16.23%
1968	801	6.78%	1,745	14.77%	9,266	78.45%
1972	8,461	79.90%	1,891	17.86%	238	2.25%
1976	6,551	48.50%	6,646	49.20%	311	2.30%
1980	8,688	57.20%	5,947	39.15%	555	3.65%
1984	11,694	72.74%	4,198	26.11%	185	1.15%
1988	10,852	69.84%	4,501	28.97%	186	1.20%
1992	11,356	55.70%	6,223	30.52%	2,809	13.78%
1996	12,937	61.76%	6,530	31.18%	1,479	7.06%
2000	16,777	70.48%	6,652	27.94%	375	1.58%
2004	22,056	76.90%	6,471	22.56%	153	0.53%
2008	25,777	75.12%	8,301	24.19%	237	0.69%
2012	26,253	73.86%	8,954	25.19%	339	0.95%
2016	27,634	74.17%	8,443	22.66%	1,183	3.17%
2020	30,164	73.52%	10,367	25.27%	499	1.22%
2024	31,374	75.37%	9,774	23.48%	476	1.14%

United States Senate election results for Elmore County, Alabama2
Year	Republican		Democratic		Third party(ies)	
Year	No.	%	No.	%	No.	%
2020	29,459	72.00%	11,399	27.86%	60	0.15%

United States Senate election results for Elmore County, Alabama3
Year	Republican		Democratic		Third party(ies)	
Year	No.	%	No.	%	No.	%
2022	20,167	78.17%	4,925	19.09%	706	2.74%

Alabama Gubernatorial election results for Elmore County
Year	Republican		Democratic		Third party(ies)	
Year	No.	%	No.	%	No.	%
2022	20,189	78.33%	4,508	17.49%	1,076	4.17%

== Economy ==
Over the past two decades, Elmore County has transferred from an economy based on agriculture to one of Alabama's fastest-growing counties. According to a recent report, 1110 jobs were created over the last 4 years.

Elmore County's largest employer is the manufacturing sector. The top ten manufacturers in Elmore County include: GKN Aerospace, Neptune Technologies, Frontier Yarns, Russell Corporation, Madix, Inc, Arrowhead Composites, Hanil USA, YESAC Alabama Corporation, Quality Networks, Inc., and AES Industries.

== Education ==
The Elmore County Public School System serves most of the county. A portion is in the Tallassee City School District.

== Communities ==
=== Cities ===
- Prattville (partly in Autauga County)
- Millbrook (partly in Autauga County)
- Tallassee (partly in Tallapoosa County)
- Wetumpka (county seat)

=== Towns ===
- Coosada
- Deatsville
- Eclectic
- Elmore

=== Census-designated places ===
- Blue Ridge
- Emerald Mountain
- Holtville
- Redland

=== Unincorporated communities ===
- Seman
- Titus

=== Ghost town ===
- Kowaliga

== See also ==
- National Register of Historic Places listings in Elmore County, Alabama
- Properties on the Alabama Register of Landmarks and Heritage in Elmore County, Alabama
