= Atlantic Seaboard Fall Line =

Escarpment in the Eastern United States

Atlantic Seaboard fall line
- Escarpment
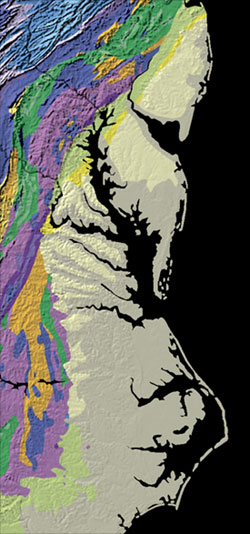
- Map showing part of the Eastern Seaboard Fall Line, where the pale-colored coastal plain meets the brightly colored Piedmont
- Location: United States
- Formed by: New Jersey, Virginia, the Carolinas, Georgia, Alabama, U.S.

Dimensions
  - Length: 900 mi (1,400 km)

The Atlantic Seaboard Fall Line, or Fall Zone, is a 900-mile (1,400 km) escarpment where the Piedmont and Atlantic coastal plain meet in the eastern United States. Much of the fall line passes through areas where no evidence of faulting is present.

== Description ==
The fall line marks the geologic boundary of hard metamorphosed terrain—the product of the Taconic orogeny—and the sandy, relatively flat alluvial plain of the upper continental shelf, formed of unconsolidated Cretaceous and Cenozoic sediments. Examples of fall zone features include the Potomac River's Little Falls and the rapids in Richmond, Virginia, where the James River falls across a series of rapids down to its tidal estuary.

Before navigation improvements, such as locks, rapids or waterfalls along the fall line were generally the head of navigation on rivers and necessitated portage around them. Numerous cities initially formed along the fall line because of the easy river transportation to seaports, as well as the availability of water power to operate mills and factories, thus bringing together river traffic and industrial labor. U.S. Route 1 and Interstate 95 link many of the fall-line cities.

In 1808, Treasury Secretary Albert Gallatin noted the significance of the fall line as an obstacle to improved national communication and commerce between the Atlantic seaboard and the western river systems:

The most prominent, though not perhaps the most insuperable obstacle in the navigation of the Atlantic rivers, consists in their lower falls, which are ascribed to a presumed continuous granite ridge, rising about one hundred and thirty feet above tide water. That ridge from New York to James River inclusively arrests the ascent of the tide; the falls of every river within that space being precisely at the head of the tide; pursuing thence southwardly a direction nearly parallel to the mountains, it recedes from the sea, leaving in each southern river an extent of good navigation between the tide and the falls. Other falls of less magnitude are found at the gaps of the Blue Ridge, through which the rivers have forced their passage...

Gallatin's observation was sound, though simplified and limited by the knowledge of his time. The limits of the fall line are subject to some dispute. In the north, the fall line is usually understood to have its northern limit at New Brunswick, New Jersey. However, a geologic continuation in fact crosses the Hackensack and Passaic rivers at the cities of those names, to which navigation was possible. In the south, some such as Gallatin and the USGS imply its end to be in the Carolinas or Georgia, and to include only rivers running to the Atlantic; others trace it farther west through Georgia and Alabama as its geologic continuation.

== Cities and towns ==
Only the principal city of an area is listed below. However, two cities may belong on one river, if the one downstream is at the effective head of navigation and the one upstream at the site of useful water power.

Cities that lie along the Piedmont–Coastal Plain fall line include the following (from north to south):

- New Brunswick, New Jersey on the Raritan River.
- Trenton, New Jersey, on the Delaware River.
- Philadelphia, Pennsylvania, on the Schuylkill River.
- Wilmington, Delaware, on the Brandywine River.
- Havre de Grace, Maryland, on the Susquehanna River/head of Chesapeake Bay.
- Baltimore, Maryland, on Herring Run, Jones Falls, and Gwynns Falls.
- Washington, D.C., on the Potomac River.
- Fredericksburg, Virginia on the Rappahannock River.
- Richmond, Virginia, on the James River.
- Petersburg, Virginia, on the Appomattox River.
- Emporia, Virginia, on the Meherrin River.
- Goldsboro, North Carolina and Smithfield, North Carolina, on the Neuse River.
- Fayetteville, North Carolina, on the Cape Fear River.
- Columbia, South Carolina, on the Congaree River.
- Augusta, Georgia, on the Savannah River.
- Macon, Georgia, on the Ocmulgee River.
- Columbus, Georgia, on the Chattahoochee River.
- Tuscaloosa, Alabama, on the Black Warrior River.
- Wetumpka, Alabama, on the Coosa River. The river and fall line run along the outside slope of the Wetumpka meteor impact crater, through an uplifted area. The crater is 82 MYA and the fall line is over 200 MYA.

== Geographic coordinates ==
Atlantic Seaboard fall line, north-to-south
State	Point (crossing)	Elevation & coordinates	Fall zone: drop/width (slope)	Geomorphology Piedmont—Coastal plain
New Jersey	New Brunswick (Raritan River)	460 ft (140 m); 40°29′18″N 74°26′52″W	5–10 ft (1.5–3.0 m) (Gentle slope)	
New Jersey	Trenton (Delaware River)	40°13′18″N 74°45′22″W	8 ft (2.4 m)	Falls of the Delaware
Pennsylvania	Philadelphia (Schuylkill River by I-76)	39°57′13″N 75°10′17″W	10–12 ft (3.0–3.7 m) (Dam)	Fairmount Dam
Delaware	Wilmington (Brandywine Creek)	39°44′42″N 75°32′54″W	67 ft (20 m) (falls and rapids)	160 ft (49 m) from its headwaters to sea level, with a series of falls and rapids in Wilmington
Delaware	Newark (White Clay Creek)	39°40′39″N 75°45′26″W		
Maryland	Conowingo Dam (Susquehanna)	39°39′36″N 76°10′26″W	19–20 ft (5.8–6.1 m) (1 mi (1,600 m))	Susquehanna Falls
Maryland	Ellicott City (Patapsco)	39°16.044′N 76°47.573′W		Crystalline rock—unconsolidate marine sediments
Maryland	Little Falls (Potomac River)		76 ft (23 m) (up to 20 ft (6.1 m) over several falls)	
Washington, DC	Theodore Roosevelt Island (Potomac River)			
Virginia	Fredericksburg (Rappahannock)	38°18.11′N 77°28.25′W	30–50 ft (9.1–15.2 m)	[west of Interstate 95 bridge]
Virginia	Richmond (James River)			
Virginia	Petersburg (Appomattox River)			
Virginia	Emporia (Meherrin River)			
North Carolina	Smithfield (Neuse River)			
North Carolina	Goldsboro (Neuse River)			
North Carolina	Fayetteville (Cape Fear River)			
South Carolina	Columbia (Congaree River)	34°00.07′N 81°03.48′W	20–30 ft (6.1–9.1 m) (2.5 mi (4,000 m)	The river drops through a series of rapids.
Georgia	Augusta (Savannah River)	33.4735°N 82.0105°W	50 ft (15 m)	
Georgia	Macon (Ocmulgee River)	32.8407°N 83.6324°W	30–40 ft (9.1–12.2 m)	
Georgia	Columbus (Chattahoochee River)	32.4610°N 84.9877°W	125 ft (38 m) (2.5 mi (4,000 m)	
Alabama	Wetumpka (Coosa River)	32.5354°N 86.2114°W	40–60 ft (12–18 m) (1 mi (1,600 m)	The river drops roughly 40–60 feet as it crosses the fall line near a meteor impact crater.
Alabama	Tuscaloosa (Black Warrior River)	32.4610°N 84.9877°W	120 ft (37 m) (1 mi (1,600 m)	The river drops approximately 120 feet where the Coastal Plain meets the Cumberland Plateau.
