= National Register of Historic Places listings in Elmore County, Alabama =

Location of Elmore County in Alabama

This is a list of the National Register of Historic Places listings in Elmore County, Alabama.

This is intended to be a complete list of the properties and districts on the National Register of Historic Places in Elmore County, Alabama, United States. Latitude and longitude coordinates are provided for many National Register properties and districts; these locations may be seen together in a Google map.

There are 13 properties and districts listed on the National Register in the county, including one National Historic Landmark.

This National Park Service list is complete through NPS recent listings posted May 1, 2026.

== Current listings ==
	Name on the Register	Image	Date listed	Location	City or town	Description
1	Alabama State Penitentiary	Alabama State Penitentiary	May 8, 1973 (#73000342)	Northeast of Wetumpka on U.S. Route 231; 32°33′02″N 86°11′28″W	Wetumpka	
2	East Wetumpka Commercial Historic District	East Wetumpka Commercial Historic District	February 20, 1992 (#92000055)	Roughly Company St. from Spring St. to E. Bridge St. and E. Bridge and Commerce Sts. from Main to Hill Sts. 32°32′16″N 86°12′16″W	Wetumpka	
3	Ellerslie		December 24, 2013 (#13000957)	2650 Edgewood Rd. 32°28′08″N 86°22′38″W	Millbrook vicinity	
4	First Baptist Church of Wetumpka	First Baptist Church of Wetumpka	October 24, 2008 (#06001101)	205 W. Bridge St. 32°32′21″N 86°12′35″W	Wetumpka	
5	First Presbyterian Church of Wetumpka	First Presbyterian Church of Wetumpka	October 8, 1976 (#76000324)	W. Bridge St. 32°32′21″N 86°12′31″W	Wetumpka	
6	First United Methodist Church	First United Methodist Church	February 15, 1973 (#73000343)	308 Tuskeena St. 32°32′25″N 86°12′12″W	Wetumpka	
7	Fort Toulouse	Fort Toulouse	October 15, 1966 (#66000148)	4 miles (6.4 km) southwest of Wetumpka at the confluence of the Coosa and Tallapoosa rivers 32°30′16″N 86°15′26″W	Wetumpka	
8	Abel Hagerty House	Abel Hagerty House	January 14, 2008 (#07001389)	4690 Jasmine Hill Rd. 32°28′23″N 86°11′17″W	Wetumpka	
9	Hickory Ground		March 10, 1980 (#80000685)	Southwest of Wetumpka; 32°31′16″N 86°15′24″W	Wetumpka	
10	Robinson Springs United Methodist Church	Robinson Springs United Methodist Church	March 1, 1982 (#82002012)	State Routes 14 and 143; 32°30′55″N 86°22′28″W	Millbrook	
11	Tallassee Commercial Historic District	Tallassee Commercial Historic District	March 6, 1992 (#92000072)	Roughly 3 blocks on the southern side of Barnett Boulevard between old River Rd. and DuBois St. 32°31′57″N 85°53′44″W	Tallassee	
12	Tallassee Mills	Tallassee Mills	April 26, 2010 (#09000734)	1844 Old Mill Rd. 32°31′57″N 85°53′24″W	Tallassee	
13	Wetumpka L&N Depot	Wetumpka L&N Depot	July 1, 1975 (#75000312)	Coosa St. 32°32′26″N 86°12′41″W	Wetumpka	

== See also ==
- List of National Historic Landmarks in Alabama
- National Register of Historic Places listings in Alabama
