= Monica Lisa Stevenson =

American gospel musician

- Born: Monica Felicia Bowen; April 21, 1967 (age 59); Wetumpka, Alabama
- Origin: Atlanta, Georgia
- Genres: Gospel, traditional black gospel
- Occupations: Singer, songwriter
- Instruments: Vocals, singer-songwriter
- Years active: 2009–present
- Labels: Monicazmuzik, Central South
- Website: monicazmuzik.com

Monica Lisa Stevenson (born April 21, 1967, as Monica Felicia Bowen) is an American gospel musician. Her first album, Finally...in God's Time, was released by Monicazmuzik in 2009. The subsequent album, Live in Atlanta, was released in 2013 by Central South Records. This was a Billboard magazine breakthrough release on the Gospel Albums chart and Heatseekers Albums chart. She was nominated at the 2009 Stellar Awards in two categories.

== Early life ==
Stevenson was born on April 21, 1967, as Monica Felicia Bowen in Wetumpka, Alabama, the daughter of George Bowen and Pearlie Ellis, and the eldest of six children of the couple.

== Music career ==
Her music recording career began in 2009, with the album, Finally...in God's Time, released by her own label, Monicazmuzik, on March 30, 2009. For this album, she was nominated at the Stellar Awards for Best New Artist and Traditional Female Vocalist of the Year. Her subsequent album, Live in Atlanta, was released on May 14, 2013, by Central South Records. This album was her breakthrough release upon two Billboard magazine charts: the Gospel Albums at No. 14 and Heatseekers Albums at No. 25. The Gospel Music Workshop of America counts her as a member. Her husband does the production for her albums.

== Personal life ==
Stevenson is married to Derrick Stevenson, and the couple have five children, Qwenton, Khalon, D’errica, Derrick, Jr., and Zion, whom all reside in Atlanta, Georgia. They are members of New Life International Family Church, which is just outside the city in Decatur, Georgia.

== Discography ==
List of studio albums, with selected chart positions
Title	Album details	Peak chart positions	
Title	Album details	US Gos	US Heat
Finally...in God's Time	Released: March 30, 2009; Label: Monicazmuzik; CD, digital download	–	–
Live in Atlanta	Released: May 14, 2013; Label: Central South; CD, digital download	14	25
