= First United Methodist Church (Wetumpka, Alabama) =

Historic church in Alabama, United States

- First Methodist Church Wetumpka
- U.S. National Register of Historic Places
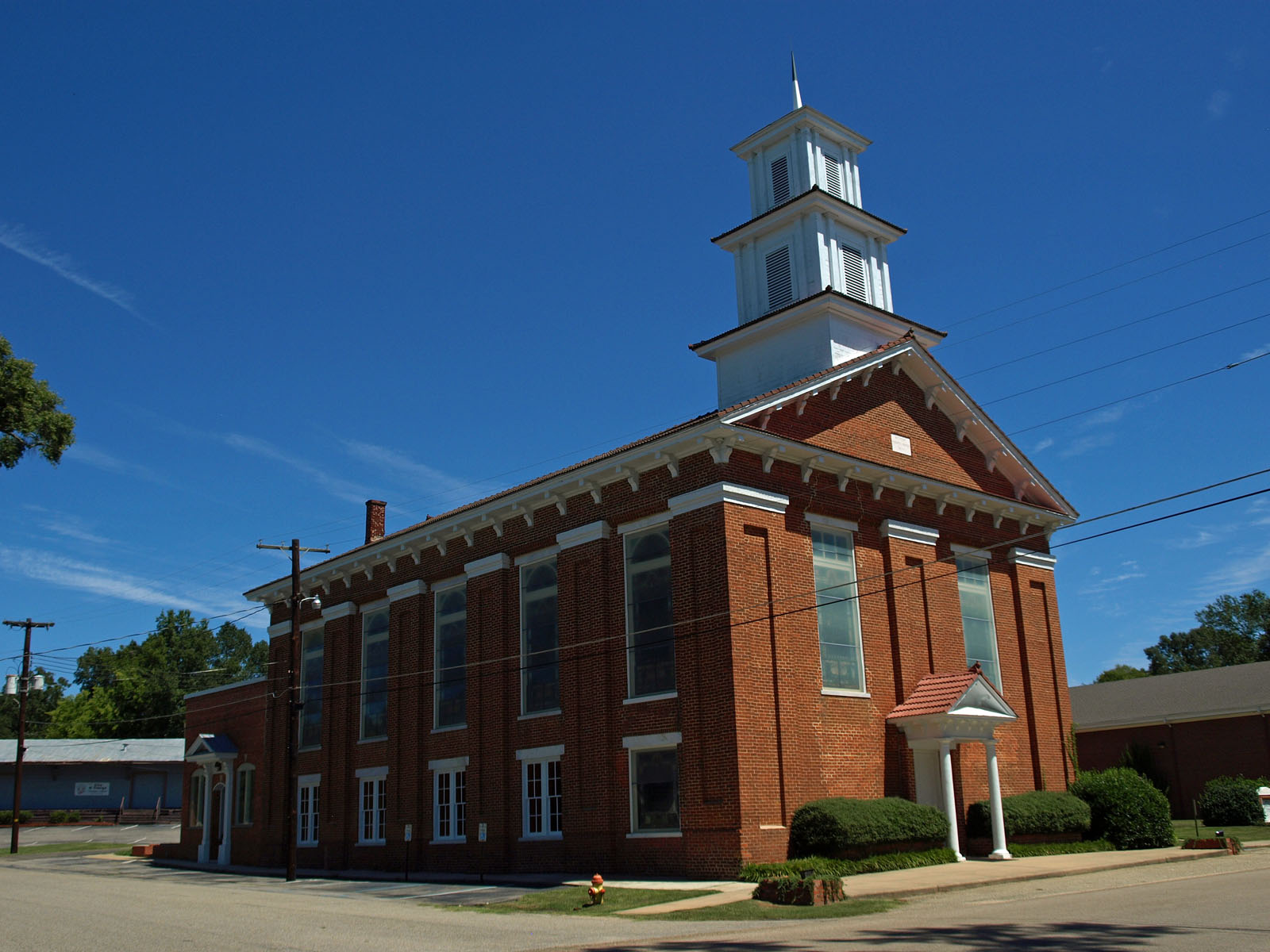

- Location within Alabama Location within the United States
- Location: 306 Tuskeena St., Wetumpka, Alabama
- Coordinates: 32°32′25″N 86°12′12″W
- Area: less than one acre
- Built: 1854
- Architectural style: Greek Revival, Italianate
- NRHP reference No.: 73000343
- Added to NRHP: February 15, 1973

First Methodist Church Wetumpka is a historic church at 306 Tuskeena Street in Wetumpka, Alabama, United States. It was built in 1854, and added to the National Register of Historic Places in 1973.
