= Poarch Creek Indian Reservation =

Coordinates: 31°05′53″N 87°33′25″W

- Indian reservation
- Location of the Poarch Creek Indian Reservation
- Tribe: Poarch Band of Creek Indians
- Country: United States
- State: Alabama

Area
  - Total: 0.93 km^{2} (0.36 sq mi)
- Website: Poarch Band of Creek Indians

The Poarch Creek Indian Reservation is a Creek Indian reservation in the state of Alabama. It is the home of the Poarch Band of Creek Indians, the only federally recognized Native American tribe in the state.

The reservation is located entirely within Escambia County, 8 miles (13 km) northwest of Atmore. Of the Poarch Band's 2,340 members, about 1,000 lived on or near the 230-acre (0.93 km^{2}) reservation as of 2006. The Poarch Band also holds other trust lands in Alabama and Florida.

== History ==
Despite the forced removal of Creek Indians from Georgia and Alabama in 1836, some Creeks in the Tensaw district of Alabama maintained a distinct community around the small town of Poarch, with segregated schools established by 1908. The federal government held a tract of land at Poarch in trust for the Indians until 1924. In the 1940s the community began to organize politically in its own interest, and from 1950 to 1970 tribal leader Calvin McGhee spearheaded a campaign for recognition of Creek land claims in the southeastern states. The Poarch Band raised funds largely through an annual Thanksgiving Day Pow Wow.

Established as a federal reservation in 1984, the Poarch Creek Indian Reservation is governed by a nine-member tribal council and provides police, fire, judicial, and social services. A "bingo hall" has been wholly owned by the tribal government since 1990, along with some small industrial plants and a restaurant and motel.

Map of the Poarch Creek Indian Reservation.
