= Poarch Band of Creek Indians =

Tribe of Native Americans in Alabama, United States

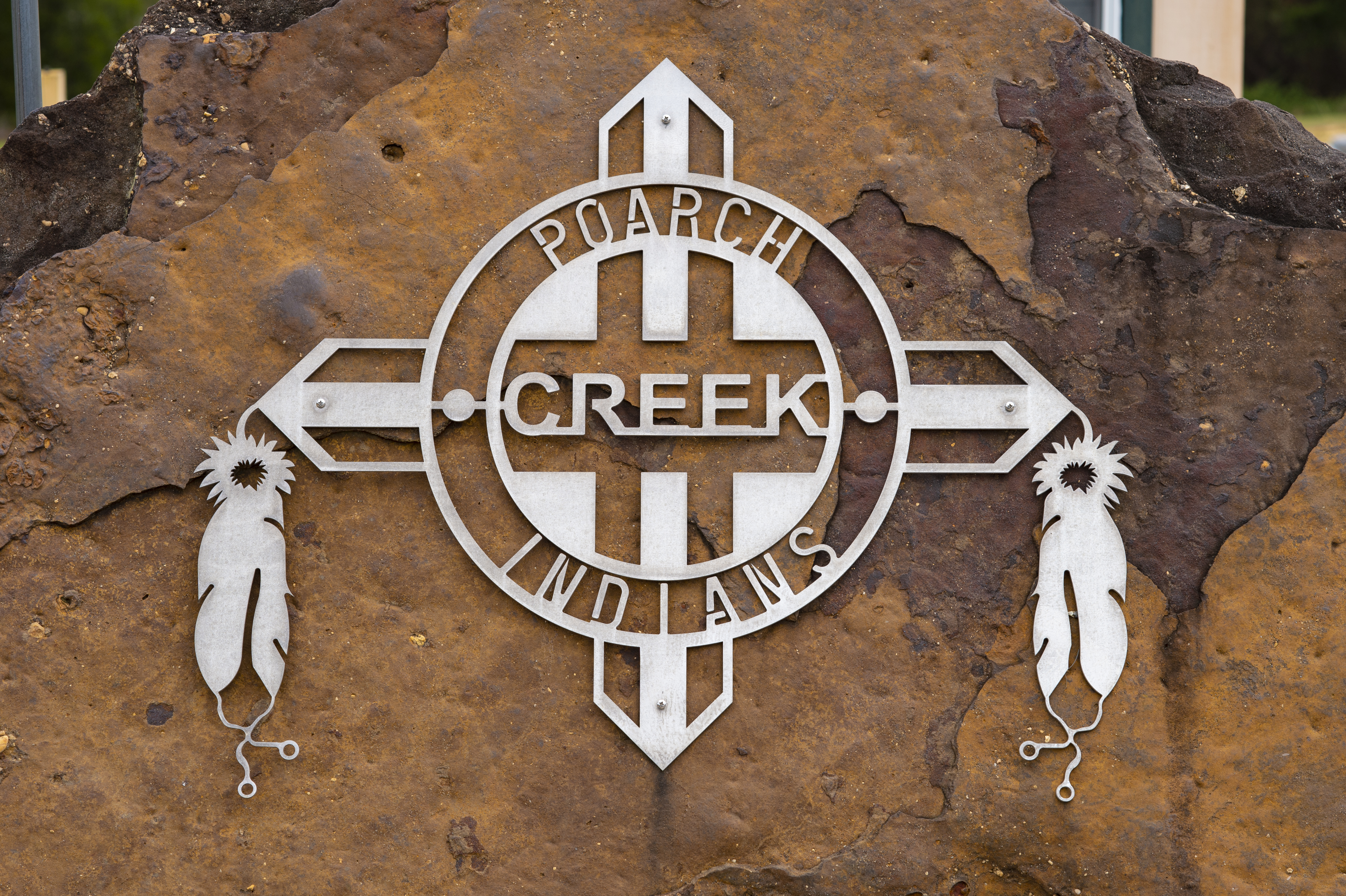
- Emblem of the Poarch Band of Creek Indians

Total population
- 2,340 (2006)

Regions with significant populations
- United States ( Alabama)

Languages
- English, formerly Muscogee

Religion
- Protestant, traditional Creek beliefs

Related ethnic groups
- Other Muscogee Creek tribes, Alabama Creole people

The Poarch Band of Creek Indians (/pɔːrtʃ/ PORTCH;) are a federally recognized tribe of Native Americans with reservation lands in lower Alabama. As Mvskoke people, they speak the Muscogee language. They were formerly known as the Creek Nation East of the Mississippi. The Poarch Band of Creek Indians are a sovereign nation of Muscogee (Creek) people with deep ancestral connections to lands of the Southeast United States.

Members of the Poarch Band are located mostly in Escambia County and parts of Florida. Since the late 20th century, they have operated three gaming casinos and a hotel on their lands. This has enabled them to generate revenues to support the lives of tribal members and their descendants.

== History ==
The Poarch Band members descend from Muscogee Creek Indigenous peoples of the Upper Towns and Lower Towns who intermarried with Scottish and Irish traders. Because Mvskoke ancestors of Poarch members were matrilineal and matrilocal, settler colonists targeted Mvskoke women to gain land, wealth, and power. Intermarriage was a strategy of assimilation that was common across the history of southeastern Indigenous nations in the U.S. Predominant lineages and surnames in the group include the names Weatherford, McGillivray, Durant, McGhee, Moniac, Cornell, Gibson, Colbert, Woods, and Rolin.

=== 19th century ===
In the early 19th century, various elements intensified tensions within the Creek Nation leading up to their removal. These elements included geopolitical shifts, a growing reliance on European trade and economy, inner rifts within the Creek Nation, and escalating colonial presence of British, Spanish, and U.S. forces. A faction of Creek traditionalists, known as the Red Sticks, started a rebellion against assimilated Creeks, which resulted in the U.S. government intervening against the Red Sticks. This rebellion is known as the Creek War of 1813-1814.

Among the primary concerns of Red Stick Creeks was the belief that the growing assimilation into European-American practices, including pressures to conform to Christianity and a centralized Creek governance structure, was diminishing the Creek Nation's political strength to maintain authority over their territories and economies. The rebelling Creeks ultimately met their defeat at the hands of Andrew Jackson's enforcements. Among the Poarch ancestors, the Weatherford and Woods lineages were active participants in the Red Stick rebellion and allied with the traditionalists.

Other Mvskoke ancestors of Poarch members fought alongside the U.S. against Creek traditionalists. Because of the conflicts with other Creeks, ancestors of the Poarch Band migrated to lands in the southwest of Creek Nation territory in the early 1800s near the Tensaw River and the headwaters of the Perdido River. Many of these Creek families remained in Alabama despite the Indian Removal Act of 1830, by which the majority of the tribe ceded their land and were forcibly moved to Indian Territory, west of the Mississippi River. However, several ancestors of Poarch members marched to Oklahoma, including Sam Moniac (Totkvs-Harjo) who was buried at Pass Christian in 1837.

Under provisions of the Treaty of Fort Jackson, Poarch Creek ancestors selected four sections of land that would serve as the nucleus of what eventually became known as the Poarch Band of Creek Indian community. These Indian reserves were held subject to federal trust restrictions. The "McGhee Reserve," a 240-acre tract taken by Lynn McGhee became a center of the Creek community. After the Civil War, other Creeks established lands near the McGhee Reserve. They formed a community near Poarch, Alabama and sustained kinship and cultural ties through a high degree of endogamy within the Creek community.

The Poarch Band experienced great poverty and struggled to make ends meet throughout the nineteenth century. Most were small subsistence level farmers and sharecroppers in the latter decades of the century. Like their Mvskoke relatives, the three sisters of corn, beans, and squash were common crops. Along with traditional Creek foods like sofke and corn mush, they supplemented their diet with game and fish largely taken from neighboring public lands.

With the coming of the railroad in the late nineteenth century, the lumber and turpentine industries arrived. Large corporations bought public lands, closing access to Creek subsistence practices. Many Creeks became migrant or day laborers to earn wages. They also took jobs in the lumber and turpentine industries.

Jim Crow segregation and other forms of overt racism limited opportunities for economic advancement for group members. Because they had stayed behind and not removed with the main body of the Creek Nation after the 1830s, members of the Poarch Band received no federal aid or recognition of their indigenous status at the tribal level.

Poarch families endured these challenges by relying on strong kinship and community ties. These relations have enabled many among them to retain their connection to language and traditions like busk, stompdance, and chinaberry beading.

=== 20th century ===
In the first decades of the 20th century, local governments established segregated schools for Creek Indian children in southwest Alabama. Because of Jim Crow segregation, Creek Indians were denied admittance to area businesses or forced to use segregated facilities in schools, theaters, and medical offices. In the 1930s, the Episcopal Church sent missionaries to assimilate the Creek community under the guise of aid. Poarch established their own school and worked to secure federal aid for the people. During the Indian New Deal of the 1930s, the Bureau of Indian Affairs, at the urging of the missionaries, sent an investigator to southern Alabama in 1938.

Finding that the Poarch Band was clearly a surviving Creek enclave, the Bureau agent recommended educational aid for the community. Coupled with this recommendation was the decision to not establish a federal Indian reservation for the group. Because of federal funding shortages, no federal Indian aid was provided for the Poarch Band during the 1930s and early 1940s.

After World War II, Calvin McGhee, a descendant of Band founder Lynn McGhee, began organizing the Creeks of southern Alabama and northern Florida to pursue land claims and other rights denied to them as Indigenous people. Under McGhee, the group filed a lawsuit for equal education and won their case, several years before the landmark Brown v. Board of Education Supreme Court decision in 1954.

Also in the late 1940s, McGhee spearheaded an effort to file a lands claim case with the Indian Claims Commission. He formed a group that became the Creek Nation East of the Mississippi that pursued a case for compensation for lands lost by the Creeks in the 19th century. The group received a favorable judgment; members received sums beginning in 1972 as reparations.

Through the lands claims litigation, Bufford Rollins and Eddie Tullis emerged as leaders of the Poarch Creek community. Along with Calvin McGhee, they took part in major events that were happening due to increasing visibility of Indigenous people, nations, and literary and cultural aesthetics in the 1960s and early 1970s throughout the U.S. Calvin McGhee attended the landmark Chicago Indian Conference of 1961, an event that galvanized movements toward Indigenous rights and sovereignty.

McGhee was among the delegation that presented the Conference's "Declaration of Indian Purpose" to President John F. Kennedy at the White House in 1961. The Conference, along with other pan-Indian activism, prompted Kennedy's successor, Lyndon Johnson, to establish Indian programs outside the Bureau of Indian Affairs as part of his War on Poverty after 1963. Poarch Creeks secured federal grants during this era. They established federal job training, Headstart, and Department of Education Title IV Indian Education programs for area Creeks.

To fundraise for tribal organizing, the Poarch community advanced several community events, such as the intertribal Thanksgiving Powwow. Despite Mvskoke people not dancing powwow historically, Poarch members took advantage of the limited knowledge of Native American history in the United States to gain more funds and visibility for their Nation.

The group also worked to formalize its government structures. Emerging from the Indian Claims Commission's petition by the Creek Nation East of the Mississippi in the early 1970s, McGhee, Tullis, and Rollins founded the modern government of the Poarch Band of Creek Indians, centered near Poarch, Alabama.

After the death of Calvin McGhee in the early 1970s, Eddie Tullis was elected as McGhee's successor. The Band joined the National Congress of American Indians and was active in pan-tribal eastern Indian organizations at the time. With a federal Administration for Native Americans grant, the Band secured funding to research and to write a petition for federal tribal recognition during the 1970s.

With the help of anthropologist Tony Paredes per requirements of the Bureau of Indian Affairs, the Band utilized federal land records, censuses, court records, and school documents to prove they were a surviving and continuous Creek People, eligible for federal tribal status under the Bureau of Indian Affairs' Federal Acknowledgment Process regulations created in 1978. The Band was successful in this effort, being one of the first tribes to secure federal status through the federal process in 1984. Afterward, the Band was able to have a 229-acre tract taken into trust as a federal Indian Reservation and to re-establish their own government under a written constitution. These lands provide the grounds for the tribal reservation.

== Tribal membership requirements ==
To be eligible to enroll in the Poarch Band of Creek Indians, people must be descended from one or more American Indians listed on one of three rolls: the 1870 U.S. Census of Escambia County, Alabama; 1900 U.S. Census of Escambia County, Alabama; or 1900 U.S. Special Indian Census of Monroe County, Alabama. Besides being of direct Mvskoke Creek heritage, they must have a minimum blood quantum of 1/4 American Indian blood (equivalent to one full-blooded Creek grandparent) and not be enrolled in any other tribe. There are two distinctions of membership, including tribal enrolled membership and enrolled descendant membership that extends to first generation descendants. Each federally recognized tribe has the right to make its own rules of citizenship.

== Current status ==
The Poarch Creek Indian Reservation is located in southern Alabama near the city of Atmore, Alabama. Their current tribal chairwoman is Stephanie Bryan.

== Gaming and racing ==
The Poarch Band has several casinos operating under Wind Creek Hospitality, a tribe-owned company. Three of its casinos are located on sovereign tribal land in Alabama: Wind Creek Atmore, Wind Creek Montgomery, and Wind Creek Wetumpka. They have gradually expanded their gaming, resort and entertainment businesses beyond those on their reservation.

Beyond its reservation, the tribe owns majority stakes in Mobile Greyhound Park in Alabama, and Pensacola Greyhound Park and Creek Entertainment Gretna in Florida. In the Caribbean, the tribe owns two hotel casinos operating under the Renaissance Hotels brand in Aruba and Curacao, which it purchased in October 2017.

In Gardnerville, Nevada, the tribe financed and manages the Wa She Shu Casino, owned by the Washoe Tribe. The casino opened in May 2016. In D'Iberville, Mississippi, Wind Creek purchased land for a planned casino development in March 2016.

In Pennsylvania, the tribe agreed in March 2018 to purchase Sands Casino Resort Bethlehem for $1.3 billion. The sale was approved in May 2019 and the casino was renamed to Wind Creek Bethlehem.

In 2012 the tribe announced plans to expand their gaming operations at Hickory Ground in Wetumpka, Alabama. Not all Poarch members supported this expansion, and it remains a controversial debate in the community. The Muscogee (Creek) Nation of Oklahoma filed suit to prevent this, arguing that the expansion would require excavation and reinterment of remains from an historic Creek burial ground at the site.

The tribe made a deal in 2016 to purchase the Margaritaville Resort Casino in Bossier City, Louisiana, which would have been rebranded as a Wind Creek casino. The sale was canceled, however, because of a dispute over licensing payments for the Margaritaville name.

In late 2019, the Poarch Band of Creek Indians presented the state of Alabama with a grand bargain that would afford the tribe exclusive rights on casino gambling in exchange for $1 billion.

The Poarch Band of Creek Indians opened the Park at OWA, an amusement park in Foley, Alabama, on July 20, 2017. The 520-acre (2.1 km^{2}) site was a joint venture between the City of Foley and the Foley Sports Tourism Complex, developed in conjunction with the Poarch Band of Creek Indians as part of a city-wide sports tourism push. An indoor water park known as Tropic Falls was announced in 2021; the first of the water park's two phases opened in June 2022.

== Bibliography ==
- Littlefield, Jr., Daniel F. and James W. Parins, ed. Encyclopedia of American Indian Removal, Santa Barbara, CA: Greenwood, 2011. ISBN 978-0-313-36041-1.
- Miller, Mark Edwin. Claiming Tribal Identity: The Five Tribes and the Politics of Federal Acknowledgment. Norman: University of Oklahoma Press, 2013.
