= Wetumpka, Alabama =

City, United States

Wetumpka Ue-Tumhkv (Creek)
- City
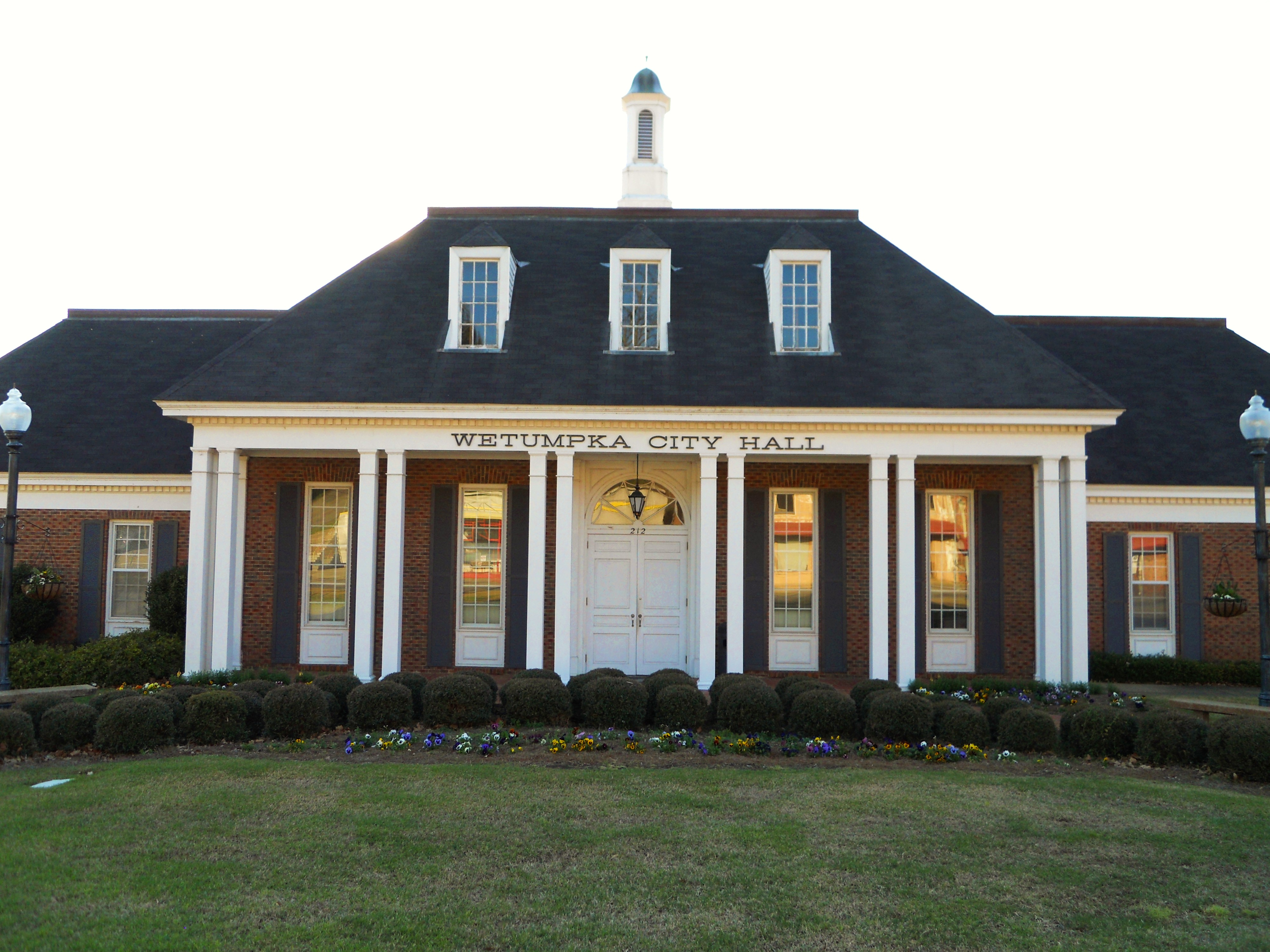
- Downtown Wetumpka

- Location of Wetumpka in Elmore County, Alabama.
- Coordinates: 32°30′25″N 86°14′18″W
- Country: United States
- State: Alabama
- County: Elmore

Government
  - Type: Mayor/Council

Area
  - Total: 11.39 sq mi (29.51 km^{2})
  - Land: 10.95 sq mi (28.37 km^{2})
  - Water: 0.44 sq mi (1.14 km^{2})
- Elevation: 125 ft (38 m)

Population (2020)
  - Total: 7,220
  - Density: 659.1/sq mi (254.48/km^{2})
- Time zone: UTC-6 (Central (CST))
  - Summer (DST): UTC-5 (CDT)
- ZIP Codes: 36092-36093
- Area code: 334
- FIPS code: 01-81720
- GNIS feature ID: 2405723
- Website: wetumpkaal.gov

Wetumpka (US: /wɪˈtʌmkə/, Creek: Ue-Tumhkv) is a city in and the county seat of Elmore County, Alabama, United States. At the 2020 census, the population was 7,220. In the early 21st century, Elmore County became one of the fastest-growing counties in the state. The city is considered part of the Montgomery Metropolitan Area.

Wetumpka identifies as "The City of Natural Beauty". Among the notable landmarks are the Wetumpka crater and the Jasmine Hill Gardens, with a full-sized replica of the Temple of Hera of Olympia, Greece. Historic downtown Wetumpka developed on both sides of the Coosa River. It was near Fort Toulouse, built by French colonists in 1717, when they had claimed this territory for the king.

== Etymology ==
The placename Wetumpka (Ue-Tumhkv) is derived from the Muscogee Creek Native American language phrase we-wau tum-cau meaning "rumbling waters", believed to be a description of the sound of the nearby Coosa River at the rapids of the Devil's Staircase. The roar of the rapids reportedly could be heard for miles before the construction in the 20th century of Walter Bouldin Dam and Jordan Dam, when the river was captured as a reservoir behind the dam.

After being forced west to Indian Territory (present-day Oklahoma), by United States soldiers under the Indian Removal Act of 1830, the Muscogee named their major settlement there Wetumka, after their historic village.

== History ==
Wetumpka was long settled by the Muscogee people, whose territory extended through present-day Georgia and Alabama. Their largest towns were on the banks of the Coosa and at its confluence with the Tallapoosa River, at Wetumpka and Talisi (now Tallassee), respectively.

=== French and British colonization ===
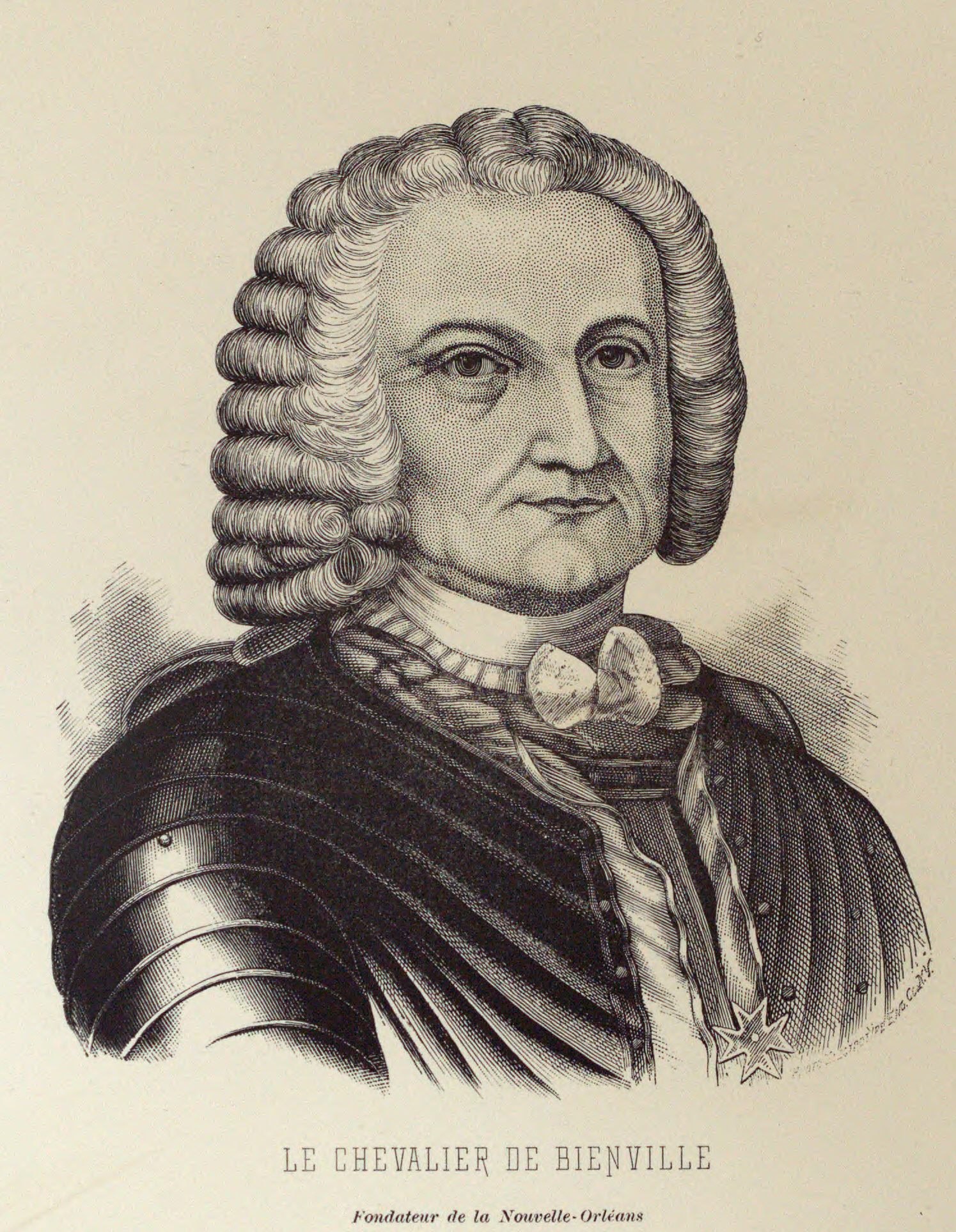
Le Moyne, Sieur de Bienville

After moving the 1702 settlement of Mobile to Mobile Bay in 1711, Jean-Baptiste Le Moyne, Sieur de Bienville sent an expedition up the Alabama River to establish a fort in the interior of the colony, known as La Louisiane or New France, to stop the encroachment of British colonists and to foster trade and goodwill with the Creek.

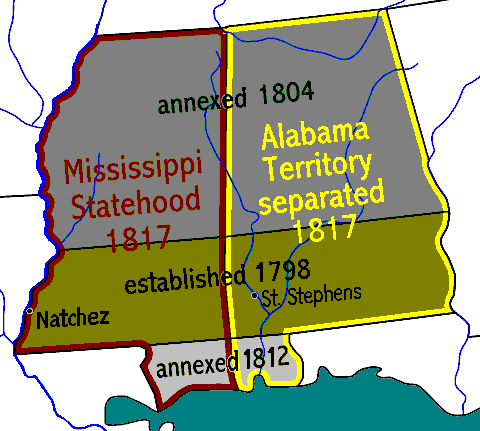
Mississippi Territory from 1798 (expanded 1804/1812), with Alabama Territory created March 3, 1817

Bienville directed the construction of Fort Toulouse along the Coosa River in 1714, 4 miles (6 km) above the confluence of the Coosa and Tallapoosa rivers and the Creek village of Taskigi. Bienville selected this area as a strategic locale for a fortification.

The French traded at Wetumpka and garrisoned Fort Toulouse until 1763, when they ceded the territory to the British following defeat in the Seven Years' War (known as the French and Indian War in North America). For nearly a quarter century, the British had control of this area. Several Scots and Irish traders, such as McGillivray and Weatherford, were active in the region. They married into the Creek matrilineal aristocracy and later claimed vast land grants. Their descendants became important Creek leaders because of their mothers' status.

=== United States rule ===
After Britain was defeated in the American Revolutionary War, it ceded its territory east of the Mississippi River to the United States in 1783. In 1798 the US made this area part of the Mississippi Territory, after cessions from the states of Georgia and South Carolina. Between 1800 and 1812, European-American pioneers began to arrive, many with enslaved African-American laborers, and encroach on the lands of the Southeast Indian tribes.

By the early 19th century, there were tensions among the Creek, with young men of the Upper Creek promoting a revival of religion and traditional culture, and the Lower Creek, more influenced by settlement and trade with European Americans in Georgia, becoming more assimilated. In addition, in 1811, the Shawnee chief Tecumseh of the upper Northwest appealed to the Creek to join his Western Confederacy to try to drive out and exterminate the European settlers west of the Appalachians.

When the U.S. declared war on Britain in June 1812, the Upper Creek lost the assistance of the British, but they persisted with war against American settlers in the area. Upon receiving the news of the massacre at Fort Mims, whose refugees included many Lower Creek, American settlers appealed for government help. General Andrew Jackson led a militia with members from Tennessee, Mississippi, and Georgia and attacked the Creek in Alabama. The path the militia traveled became known as "Jackson's Trace".

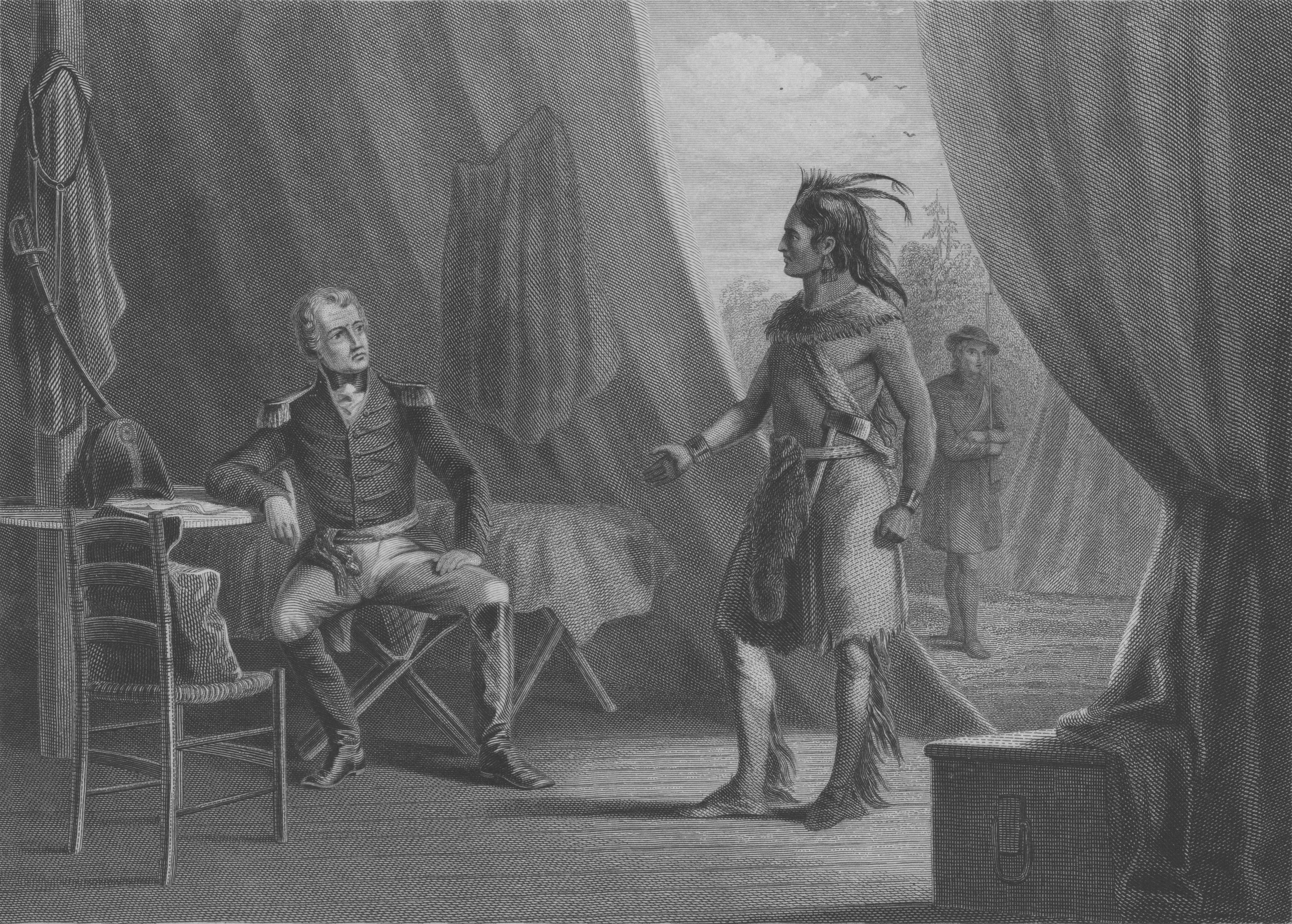
1814: Chief Red Eagle (William Weatherford) surrenders to General Andrew Jackson at Fort Jackson in Wetumpka.

Jackson's forces won a decisive victory at the Battle of Horseshoe Bend. He moved on to Fort Toulouse, where he directed its repair. During his absence, the site was renamed Fort Jackson in his honor.

Jackson made the fort his headquarters during the War of 1812. The newly created Montgomery County held its courts there. The defeated Creek were forced to sign the Treaty of Fort Jackson (1814), which ceded to the United States 23,000,000 acres (36,000 sq mi; 93,000 km^{2}) of Creek lands: much of the remainder of their territory in Georgia and most of central Alabama. After the war, many of Jackson's Tennessee militia returned home, collected their families and belongings, and brought them back to settle near the fort.

=== Growth and incorporation ===
Settlers, mostly from Georgia and the Carolinas, flooded into the fertile land that the Creeks had been forced to give up. With its strategic location at the river confluence, Wetumpka quickly became an important center of agricultural trade. The city was formally incorporated in 1834. Cotton was the commodity crop of the new state of Alabama, with cultivation of short-staple cotton in the upland areas made possible by Eli Whitney's invention of the cotton gin, which reduced the labor of processing. From the scattered fields and large plantations worked by slave labor in the interior, cotton was carted overland to Wetumpka. At the fall line of the Coosa River, the port shipped out cotton bales by steamboats which went downriver to the markets at Mobile for sale.

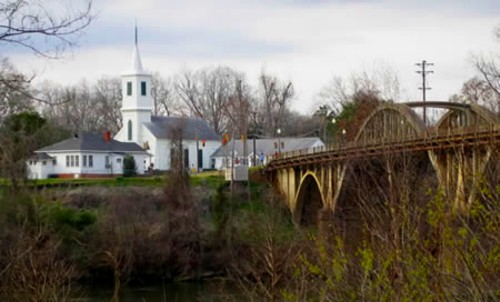
The west bank looking across the Coosa River toward two Wetumpka landmarks, the Bibb Graves Bridge (1936) and First Presbyterian Church (1856).

Wetumpka became a cotton boom town. The new city was divided in half. The part on the eastern bank of the river was commercial, with banks, stores, and hotels, and was located in Coosa County. The western section in Autauga County was residential, with houses and churches laid out on a grid pattern of streets.

By 1836, the city's population was 1,200. Harper's Weekly asserted that "Wetumpka, Alabama and Chicago, Illinois are the most promising two cities of the West. The city commissioned a steamboat, The Coosa Belle, to ferry passengers and cotton between Wetumpka and Mobile.

The same forces contributing to Wetumpka's growth were shifting the balance of power within Alabama. A standoff between the farmers of the Tennessee Valley, centered in the former capital of Huntsville, and the old mercantile wealth of Mobile, had resulted in the capital being located for many years at Tuscaloosa. By 1845, the cotton planters in the interior Black Belt had become some of the wealthiest in the country, and power was shifting toward the southern and central part of the state. Both the Black Belt cotton barons and the Mobilians wanted the capital moved.

Compromise indicated a new, centrally located capital, accessible by river and by steamboat. The lead contenders were Wetumpka (then straddling old Autauga and Coosa Counties) and the newer city of Montgomery (in Montgomery County), a few miles south. Neither city had a majority of support; representatives from north Alabama, enraged that the capital was being moved from Tuscaloosa, were indifferent to either site. Just before the vote, Montgomery lured an expensive French chef to the new hotel that had been built to house the state's representatives if Montgomery were selected. The city distributed elegant menus to the statesmen. The promise of luxury swayed the vote, and Montgomery won. That same year, a fire broke out in Wetumpka, burning warehouses and many commercial buildings. The charred bricks were carried downriver to Montgomery to supply the building boom in Alabama's new capital.

=== War and flood ===
Though their civic pride was wounded by losing the capital to Montgomery, Wetumpka's planters and merchants continued to flourish throughout the antebellum period. They promoted a plan to build a lock and dam so that boats would be able to pass above the Fall Line and travel up the Coosa as far as Rome, Georgia. One famous resident was William Lowndes Yancey, a firebrand newspaper editor and statesman who was an influential advocate of states' rights, slavery, and Southern secession.

In February 1861, representatives from seven Southern states met in Montgomery to form the Confederate government, inaugurating Jefferson Davis as their president on the steps of the Alabama state capitol. The first six states to secede were those whose residents owned the most slaves in the South. The same year saw the majority of Wetumpka's male population going off to war. Wetumpka was never harmed by Federal troops. No Union troops entered the area until early 1865, and they were driven to reach Montgomery to punish the former Confederate capital before the war ended.

Veterans of the war returned to a city and a region whose economy had been completely destroyed. In 1866, a Reconstruction government drew up a new plan of counties for the state, and Elmore County was created out of parts of Coosa, Autauga, and Montgomery counties, with Wetumpka as its county seat. (Rockford was chosen as seat of the "new" Coosa County.)

Despite this, the city's future seemed grim. Before the war (in 1850), the population had reached 3,824 to become the 3rd largest city in the state (behind Mobile and Montgomery). By 1870 it had 1,137 residents (with Black residents outnumbering Whites by a margin of 594 to 543); in 1880, 816 residents; by 1890, it had declined to 619, and would bottom out at 562 in 1900. Not until 1950 would it return to the population it had a century earlier (with 3,813 residents).

In 1886, the worst flood in city history inundated the west bank and most of downtown. The bridge connecting the city's two halves was washed away, and more than a year passed before it was replaced.

=== Lynchings ===
A number of lynchings took place in and around Wetumpka during the late 19th and early 20th centuries. The largest lynching took place on June 17, 1898, when a mob of 500 described as "some of the best and most prominent citizens of Elmore and Coosa counties" stormed the county jail where Solomon Jackson, Camp Reese, Louis Spier and Jesse Thompson were being held. A few prominent citizens and a Methodist minister tried talking the mob away from violence but they were unsuccessful. The sheriff had hidden the jail keys so that the mob couldn't get into the cells but they took a crowbar and took the cell doors off of their hinges and kidnapped the four men. The mob originally planned to burn them alive but thought that troops would intervene, so instead the men were hanged.

=== Progress ===
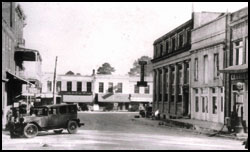
Downtown Wetumpka with Model T Ford cars

The first paved road linking Wetumpka with Montgomery was completed in 1924. Montgomery continued to grow during the two World Wars because of military spending in the region and the growth of the state government. By the 1950s, the ubiquity of the automobile allowed Wetumpka's residents to commute daily to Montgomery for work.

=== "Cat Ladies" ===
In 2022, two women were arrested and charged for feeding feral cats, which is not a crime in Wetumpka. City Judge Jeff Courtney sentenced Beverly Roberts, 85, and Mary Alston, 61, each to two years of unsupervised probation and 10 days in jail. The jail sentence was suspended. They were also ordered to each pay $100 in fines, plus court costs. After sentencing the women appealed to the Elmore County Circuit Court, at which point the city decided to no longer pursue criminal charges.

The arrests generated worldwide media coverage and opposition and resulted in Wetumpka being called a "national laughing stock. If not international." Roberts and Alston were later named "community heroes" by The Montgomery Advertiser for helping feral cats in Wetumpka. They were also featured on an episode of A&E Networks' show "My Strange Arrest".

Roberts and Alston alleged that "small-town politics" were behind what happened, saying that Wetumpka Mayor Jerry Willis "ordered Roberts' arrest because she had a history of making complaints about animal welfare matters in the city."

=== Neo-Confederate Activity ===
Wetumpka is the base of the Southern Cultural Center, a neo-Confederate group. In August 2025, Eric Orwoll, co-founder of "Return to the Land," was invited to speak at a Southern Cultural Center meeting. "Return to the Land" has established an all-white community in Arkansas. The group seeks to use the First Amendment right to “freedom of association” to establish communities that can skirt anti-discrimination and fair housing laws. Return to the Land is planning three additional communities in the Deep South or Appalachian regions, with maps indicating Alabama could be a future site.

== Geography ==
Wetumpka is located southwest of the center of Elmore County and sits on both sides of the Coosa River 5 miles (8 km) northeast of its confluence with the Tallapoosa River, where they merge to become the Alabama River.

The city is situated astride the Fall Line, where the Appalachian foothills give way to the flat Gulf Coastal Plain.

The city is located along many major US and state routes, notably U.S. Route 231, which runs east of downtown, leading north 28 mi (45 km) to Rockford and south 18 mi (29 km) to downtown Montgomery. Alabama State Route 14 runs west to east through the downtown area, leading east 22 mi (35 km) to Tallassee and southwest 17 mi (27 km) to Prattville. Other state highways that run through the city include Alabama State Route 9 and Alabama State Route 170.

Downtown Wetumpka covers two city blocks, and is bordered on the northwest by the Coosa River. The Bibb Graves Bridge crosses the river here, and is the city's most recognizable landmark. Directly across the bridge are the city's three antebellum churches, the First Methodist, First Presbyterian, and First Baptist. On January 19, 2019, a tornado destroyed the First Presbyterian church and badly damaged the first Baptist church.

According to the U.S. Census Bureau, the city has a total area of 10.5 square miles (27.2 km^{2}), of which 10.1 square miles (26.2 km^{2}) is land and 0.39 square miles (1.0 km^{2}), or 3.66%, is water.

=== Climate ===
The climate in this area is characterized by hot, humid summers and generally mild to cool winters. According to the Köppen Climate Classification system, Wetumpka has a humid subtropical climate, abbreviated "Cfa" on climate maps.

Climate data for Wetumpka, 1991–2020 normals, extremes 1896–2017
Month	Jan	Feb	Mar	Apr	May	Jun	Jul	Aug	Sep	Oct	Nov	Dec	Year
Record high °F (°C)	85 (29)	88 (31)	91 (33)	95 (35)	104 (40)	108 (42)	108 (42)	106 (41)	107 (42)	99 (37)	90 (32)	82 (28)	108 (42)
Mean daily maximum °F (°C)	57.9 (14.4)	62.4 (16.9)	70.0 (21.1)	77.0 (25.0)	84.4 (29.1)	89.8 (32.1)	92.1 (33.4)	91.6 (33.1)	87.6 (30.9)	78.3 (25.7)	68.0 (20.0)	60.3 (15.7)	76.6 (24.8)
Daily mean °F (°C)	47.1 (8.4)	50.9 (10.5)	57.9 (14.4)	64.8 (18.2)	72.9 (22.7)	79.5 (26.4)	82.0 (27.8)	81.5 (27.5)	77.0 (25.0)	66.6 (19.2)	55.8 (13.2)	49.3 (9.6)	65.4 (18.6)
Mean daily minimum °F (°C)	36.1 (2.3)	39.6 (4.2)	45.9 (7.7)	52.5 (11.4)	61.3 (16.3)	69.3 (20.7)	72.1 (22.3)	71.4 (21.9)	66.4 (19.1)	54.9 (12.7)	43.5 (6.4)	38.5 (3.6)	54.3 (12.4)
Record low °F (°C)	8 (−13)	−7 (−22)	20 (−7)	29 (−2)	39 (4)	48 (9)	55 (13)	53 (12)	40 (4)	28 (−2)	12 (−11)	12 (−11)	−7 (−22)
Average precipitation inches (mm)	4.97 (126)	5.35 (136)	5.63 (143)	4.21 (107)	3.73 (95)	4.95 (126)	5.15 (131)	4.35 (110)	3.39 (86)	2.81 (71)	3.85 (98)	4.91 (125)	53.30 (1,354)
Average snowfall inches (cm)	0.0 (0.0)	0.0 (0.0)	0.3 (0.76)	0.0 (0.0)	0.0 (0.0)	0.0 (0.0)	0.0 (0.0)	0.0 (0.0)	0.0 (0.0)	0.0 (0.0)	0.0 (0.0)	0.0 (0.0)	0.3 (0.76)
Average precipitation days (≥ 0.01 in)	9.4	9.1	8.5	6.9	6.7	9.6	10.7	9.6	6.1	6.2	6.9	8.8	98.5
Average snowy days (≥ 0.1 in)	0.0	0.0	0.1	0.0	0.0	0.0	0.0	0.0	0.0	0.0	0.0	0.0	0.1
Average dew point °F (°C)	37.8 (3.2)	40.6 (4.8)	45.5 (7.5)	52.7 (11.5)	61.2 (16.2)	68.4 (20.2)	71.4 (21.9)	70.9 (21.6)	66.0 (18.9)	55.9 (13.3)	45.9 (7.7)	41.0 (5.0)	54.8 (12.7)
Source 1: PRISM Climate Group
Source 2: NOAA

== Demographics ==
Historical population
Census	Pop.	Note	%±
1850	3,824		—
1870	1,137		—
1880	816		−28.2%
1890	619		−24.1%
1900	562		−9.2%
1910	1,103		96.3%
1920	1,520		37.8%
1930	2,357		55.1%
1940	3,089		31.1%
1950	3,813		23.4%
1960	3,672		−3.7%
1970	3,912		6.5%
1980	4,341		11.0%
1990	4,670		7.6%
2000	5,726		22.6%
2010	6,528		14.0%
2020	7,220		10.6%
2025 (est.)	7,535	▲	4.4%
U.S. Decennial Census

=== 2020 census ===
As of the 2020 census, Wetumpka had a population of 7,220. The median age was 39.1 years. 19.8% of residents were under the age of 18 and 16.2% of residents were 65 years of age or older. For every 100 females there were 75.2 males, and for every 100 females age 18 and over there were 68.8 males age 18 and over. There were 2,008 families residing in the city.

84.9% of residents lived in urban areas, while 15.1% lived in rural areas.

There were 2,568 households in Wetumpka, of which 32.1% had children under the age of 18 living in them. Of all households, 37.6% were married-couple households, 20.2% were households with a male householder and no spouse or partner present, and 36.0% were households with a female householder and no spouse or partner present. About 32.3% of all households were made up of individuals and 14.2% had someone living alone who was 65 years of age or older.

There were 2,842 housing units, of which 9.6% were vacant. The homeowner vacancy rate was 2.1% and the rental vacancy rate was 10.2%.

Wetumpka racial composition
Race	Num.	Perc.
White (non-Hispanic)	4,624	64.04%
Black or African American (non-Hispanic)	1,898	26.29%
Native American	44	0.61%
Asian	90	1.25%
Pacific Islander	9	0.12%
Other/Mixed	261	3.61%
Hispanic or Latino	294	4.07%

=== 2010 census ===
As of the census of 2010, there were 6,528 people and 2,206 households residing in the city. The population density was 645 inhabitants per square mile (249.2/km^{2}). There were 2,139 housing units at an average density of 212 per square mile (81.7/km^{2}). The racial makeup of the city was 64.88% White, 32.83% Black or African American, 0.40% Native American, 0.40% Asian, 0.07% Pacific Islander, 1.38% from other races, and 0.94% from two or more races. 2.32% of the population were Hispanic or Latino of any race.

=== 2000 census ===
There were 1,797 households, out of which 28.0% had children under the age of 18 living with them, 43.1% were married couples living together, 16.5% had a female householder with no husband present, and 37.2% were non-families. 34.2% of all households were made up of individuals, and 16.0% had someone living alone who was 65 years of age or older. The average household size was 2.30 and the average family size was 2.97.

In the city, the population was spread out, with 18.4% under the age of 18, 8.5% from 18 to 24, 36.5% from 25 to 44, 20.6% from 45 to 64, and 16.0% who were 65 years of age or older. The median age was 38 years. For every 100 females, there were 62.1 males. For every 100 females age 18 and over, there were 54.2 males.

The median income for a household in the city was $35,536, and the median income for a family was $41,500. Males had a median income of $32,403 versus $23,234 for females. The per capita income for the city was $15,729. About 7.7% of families and 11.7% of the population were below the poverty line, including 19.5% of those under age 18 and 10.7% of those age 65 or over.

== Culture, natural history, and recreation ==
=== Wetumpka on TV ===
In July 2020, Wetumpka was chosen out of 2,600 towns to be featured on HGTV's 8-episode Home Town Takeover, which started airing May 2, 2021. The series follows the efforts of Ben and Erin Napier of HGTV's Home Town (set in Laurel, Mississippi) to help revitalize Wetumpka by renovating 12 buildings and public spaces.

=== Wetumpka in movies ===
Four major films have been filmed on location in downtown Wetumpka.

- The Grass Harp (1995)
- The Rosa Parks Story (2002)
- Big Fish (2003)
- Son of the South (2020)
- The devil all the time (film)2020

=== Wetumpka meteor crater ===
Wetumpka is the home of "Alabama's greatest natural disaster". A meteorite, estimated to be 1,000 feet (300 m) wide, hit the area about 80 million years ago. The hills just east of downtown showcase the eroded remains of a 5-mile-wide (8 km) impact crater that was blasted into the bedrock, with the area labeled the Wetumpka crater or astrobleme ("star-wound") for the concentric rings of fractures and zones of shattered rock that can be found beneath the surface. In 2002, Auburn University researchers published evidence and established the site as an internationally recognized impact crater. Scientists have estimated that the energy released by the impact was over 175,000 times the energy of the nuclear bomb detonated at Hiroshima, Japan in 1945. The impact zone included the immediate crater and rim, and a much larger area of uplifted area around the rim from the shock of the impact, that would have encompassed the present-day location of the city. These uplifted rocks are aligned pointing towards the crater center, and can be seen in the river, which travels along the western edge of the crater rim.

=== Jasmine Hill Gardens ===
This outdoor museum was built in the 1930s on the estate of the Fitzpatrick family, who spent many years in Greece collecting replicas of ancient statuary to adorn their formal gardens at Jasmine Hill. The gardens are closed and will not re-open; they had several attractions including a full-sized replica of the Temple of Hera at Olympia.

=== Outdoor recreation ===
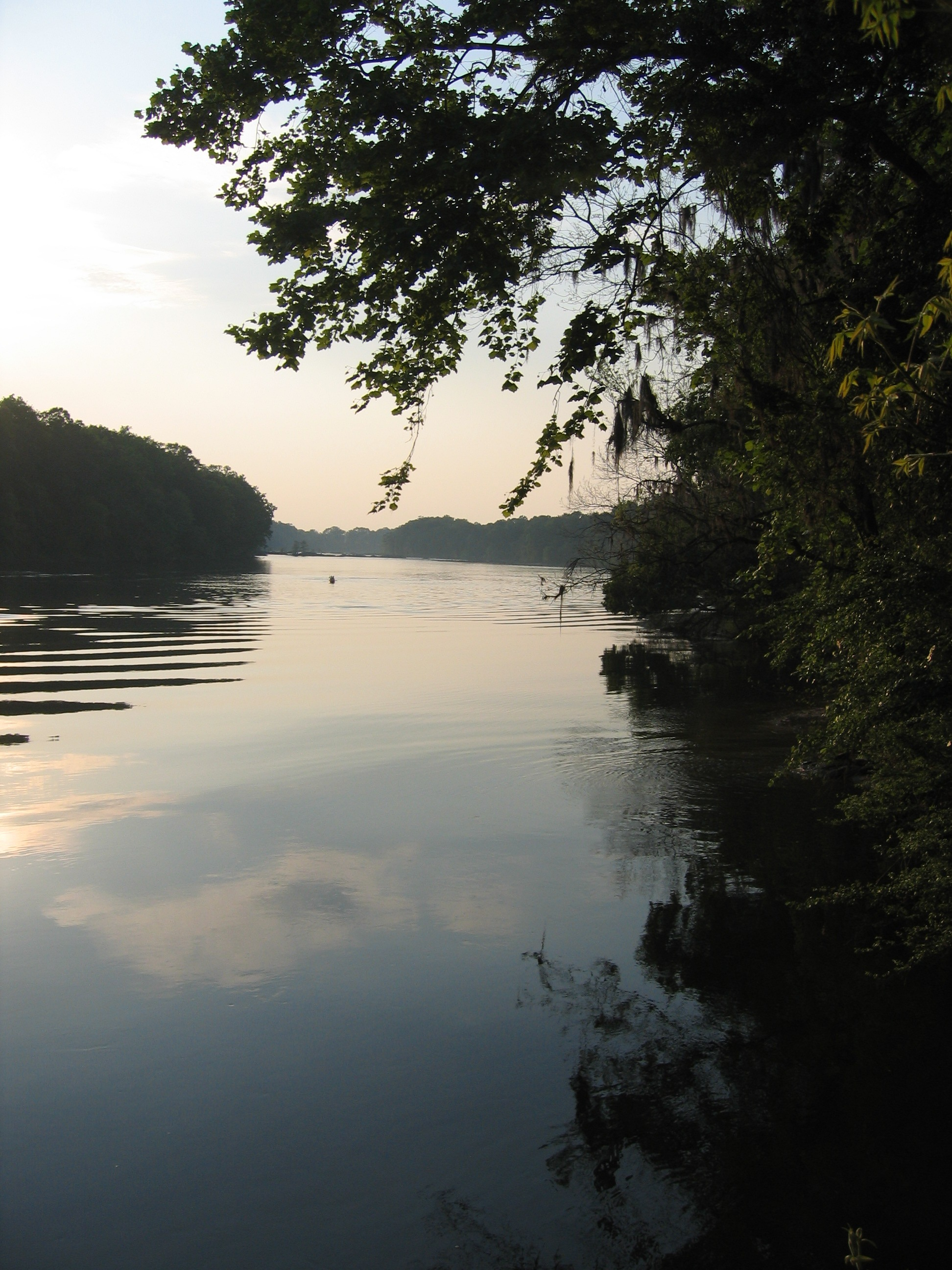
A placid Coosa River at sunset

Wetumpka and the Coosa River annually play host to the Coosa River Challenge, which began in 2003 and regularly draws 150 to 200 participants. The race, a modified triathlon, starts at the Swayback Bridge Trail with a cross country run, a mountain bike leg, and paddling on the Coosa River to finish at Goldstar Park in downtown Wetumpka.

The Swayback Bridge Trail is home to the annual mountain bike race, "Attack on Swayback".

Wetumpka is popular with white water sports enthusiasts, attracting paddlers from all over the country. The city hosts the annual Coosa River Whitewater Festival, and was the site of the 2005 U.S. Freestyle Kayaking Nationals. The Coosa River Paddling Club has constructed Corn Creek Park, which offers public access to the river, along with nature and walking trails.

=== Christmas on the Coosa ===
Christmas on the Coosa is an annual series of events held in during the month of December. The event location is the Bibb Graves Memorial Bridge. The main event is the fireworks display and boat show held on the Coosa River. Observers watch from the Bibb Graves Memorial Bridge as a parade of boats decorated with Christmas lights float down the river under the bridge as fireworks go off. This is a unique experience due to the glow of fireworks illuminating the night sky as well as the placid river surface. A host of events proceeds the river show such as Miss Christmas on the Coosa Pageant, Pictures with Santa, tree lighting, and other events centralized around the city's Gold State Park.

=== Poarch Creek casino ===
The Poarch Band of Creek Indians, the only federally recognized tribe in Alabama, have built a casino on land abutting the city. The tribe have announced plans for a major expansion of the casino to include a $246 million hotel, a second casino, and many other attractions in the complex as well. The new casino complex will employ over 1,000 people and have a 20-story, 285-room hotel named Wind Creek Wetumpka.

== Government and infrastructure ==
The United States Postal Service operates the Wetumpka Post Office.

The Julia Tutwiler Prison for Women of the Alabama Department of Corrections is in Wetumpka. The prison houses Alabama's female death row. Wetumpka was previously the site of the Wetumpka State Penitentiary.

In 2022, the Wetumpka Police Department handcuffed and arrested a group of elderly ladies for feeding stray cats in a city park. They were convicted and sentenced by local judge Jeff Courtney. The case is now under appeal.

== Education ==
The city is within the Elmore County Public School System.

Public schools include Wetumpka Elementary School, Wetumpka Middle School, Wetumpka High School, and Redland Elementary School. Wetumpka Middle School was formed by a merger of Wetumpka Intermediate School and Wetumpka Junior High School.

== Notable people ==
- James Anderson, actor, To Kill a Mockingbird
- William B. Bryant, United States federal judge from 1965 to 2005
- James Daniel, tight end coach for Pittsburgh Steelers
- John Kelly Fitzpatrick, painter
- Hanley Funderburk, president of Auburn University and Eastern Kentucky University
- Robert D. Glass, first African American justice of the Connecticut Supreme Court
- Sampson Willis Harris, former U.S. Congressman for the 3rd and 7th Districts of Alabama
- Lewis Jackson, head basketball coach of Alabama State University
- John Q. Loomis, Confederate army officer
- Jean Baptiste Louis DeCourtel Marchand, French soldier who died in Wetumpka
- Jason McLaughlin, soccer player
- Charles McMorris, US vice admiral
- Jessica Meuse, finished in fourth place on the thirteenth season of American Idol
- Benjamin White Norris, congressman from 1868 to 1869
- Frank Oliver, former NFL defensive back
- Blake Percival, whistleblower
- Jim Rogers, businessman and author
- Jason Sanford, science-fiction author
- Elizabeth Spiers, writer and editor
- Monica Lisa Stevenson, gospel musician
- Channing Tatum, actor, born in Cullman, spent part of childhood in Wetumpka
- Tevin Washington, football player, quarterback for Georgia Tech
- Thomas Williams, congressman from 1879 to 1885
- Jamie Winborn, pro football player
- William Lowndes Yancey, Confederate politician and diplomat

== Buildings ==
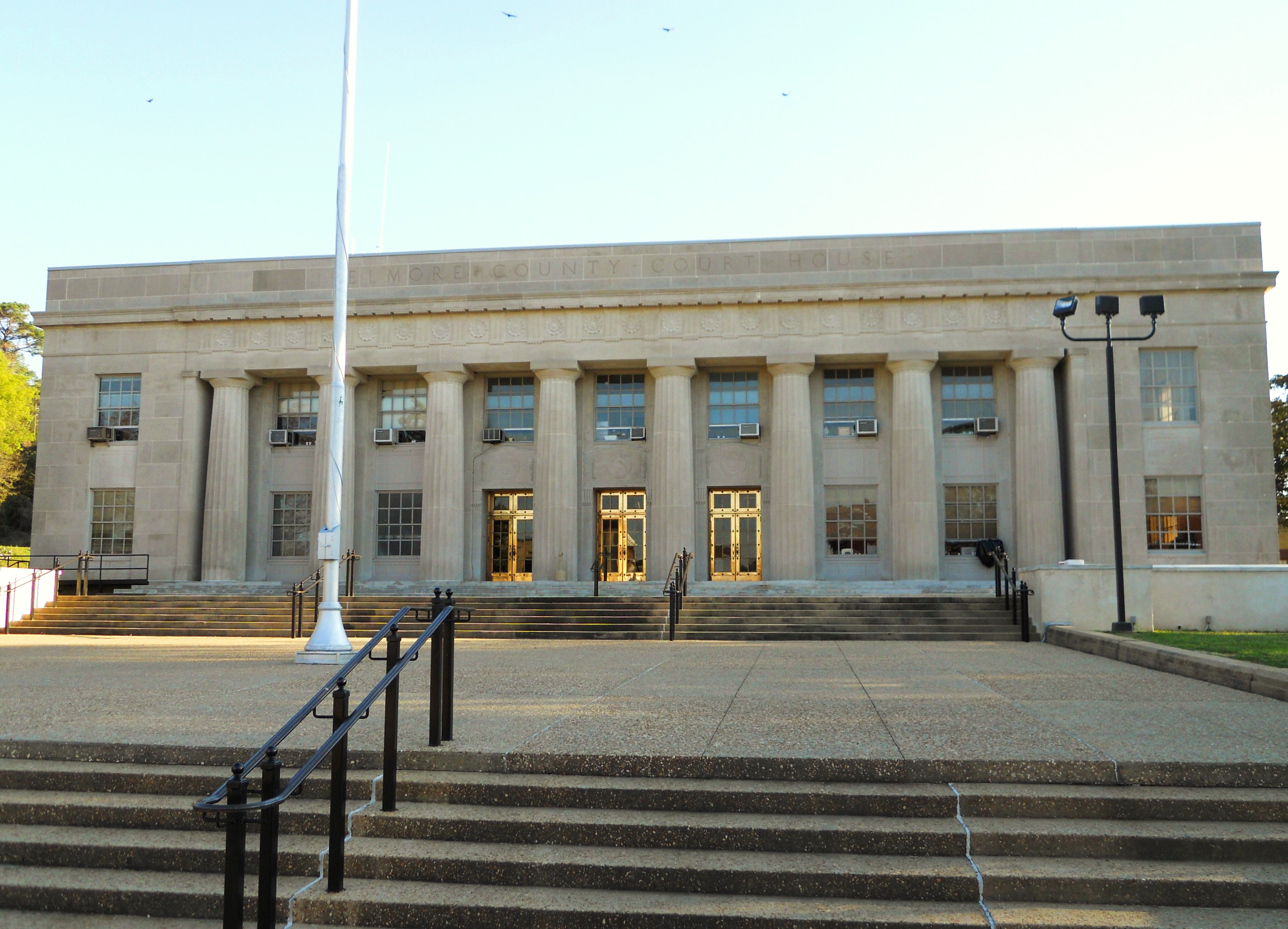
The Elmore County Courthouse is located at 100 E Commerce St. in Wetumpka.

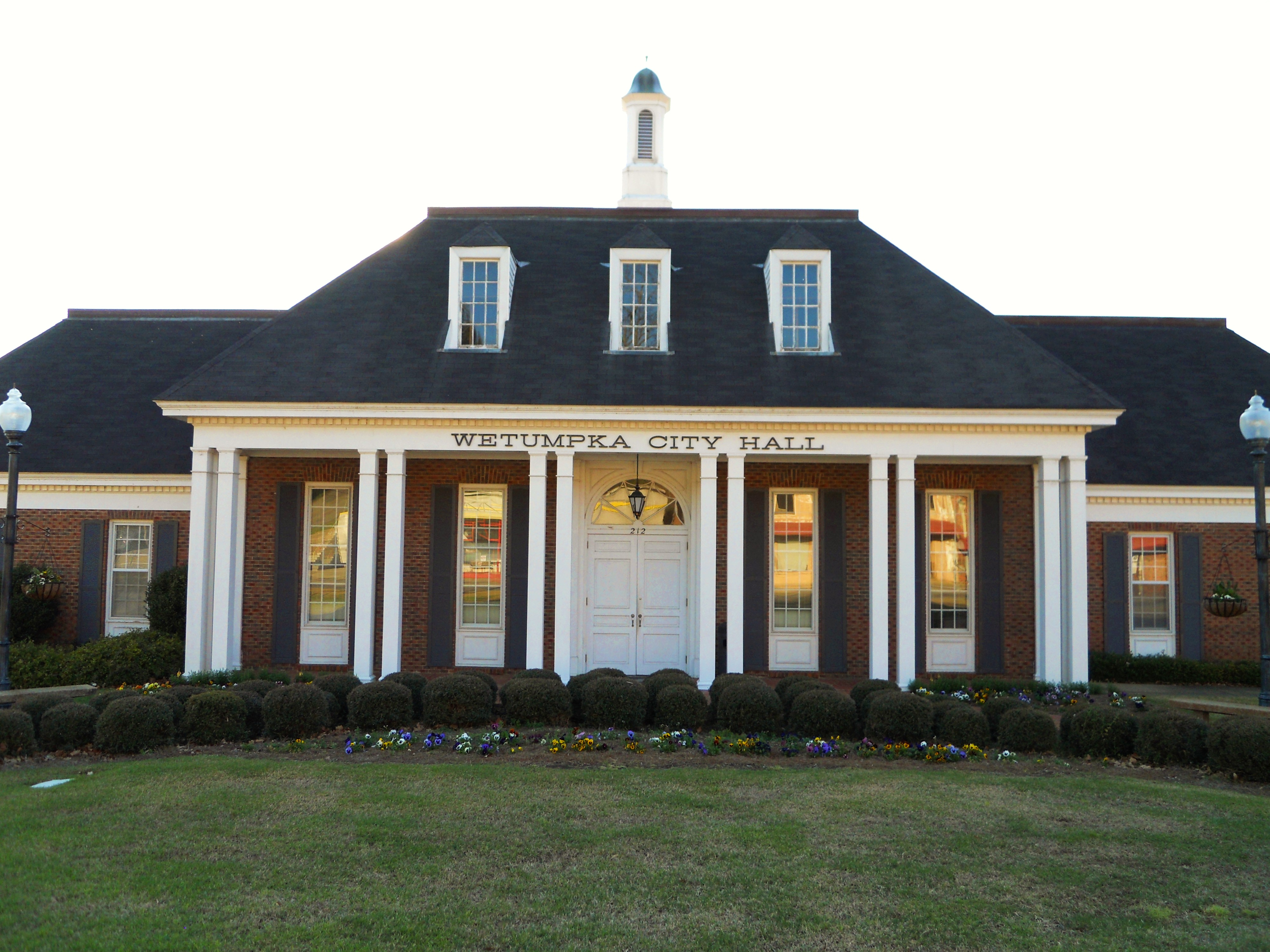
Wetumpka City Hall is located at 212 S. Main Street.

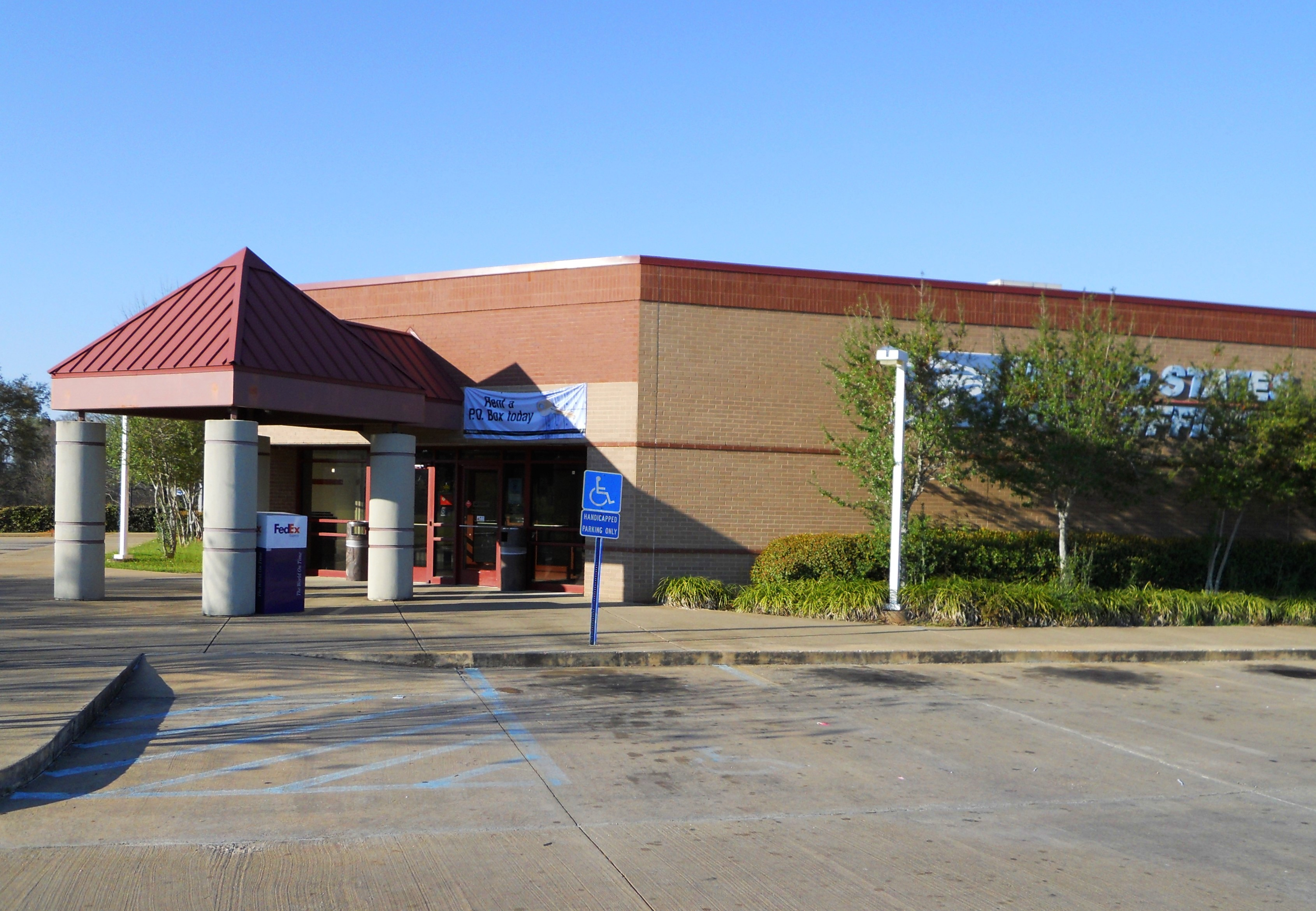
The Wetumpka Post Office is located at 216 W. Fort Toulouse Rd.

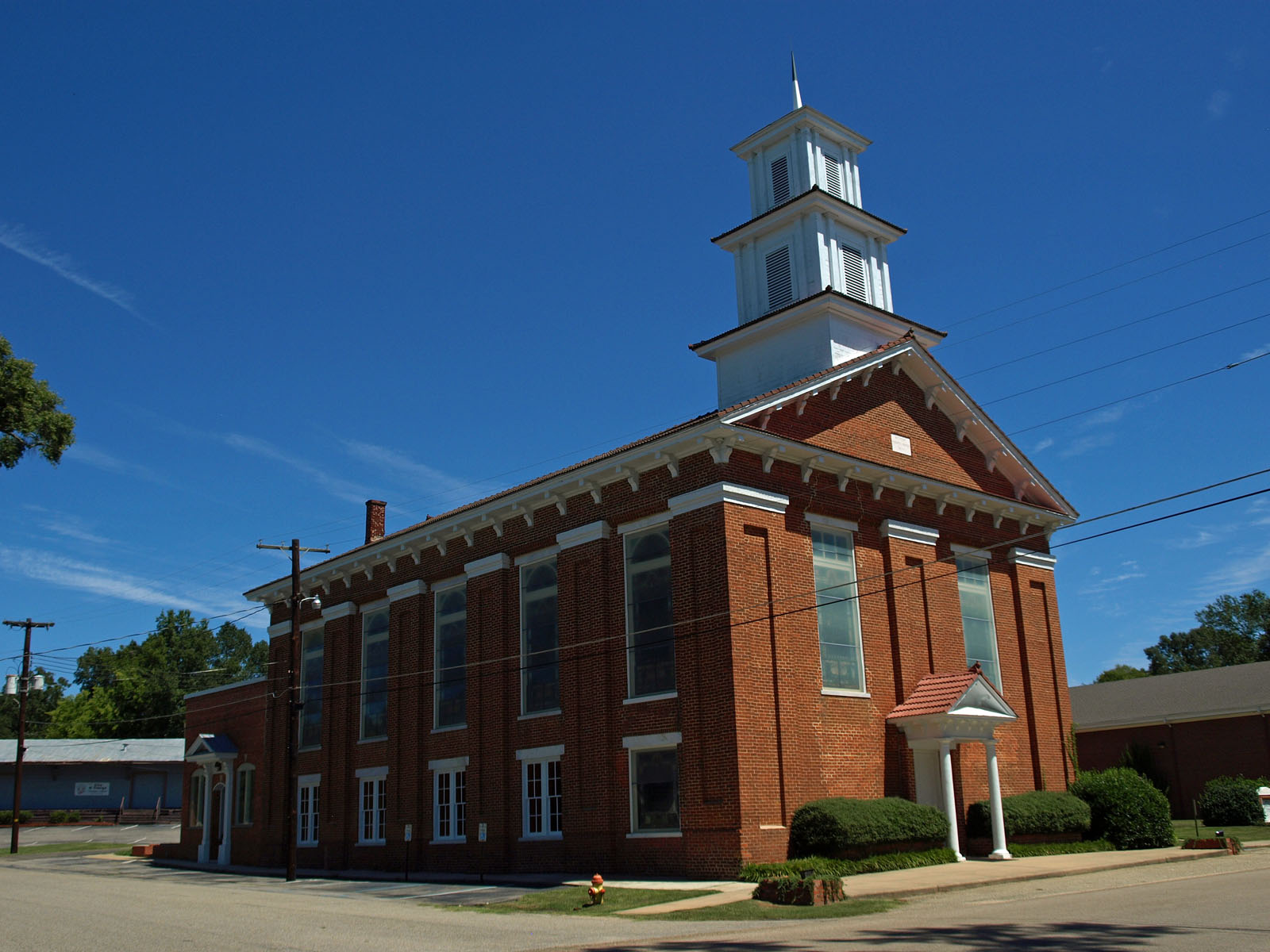
First United Methodist Church of Wetumpka. Placed on the National Register of Historic Places on February 15, 1973.

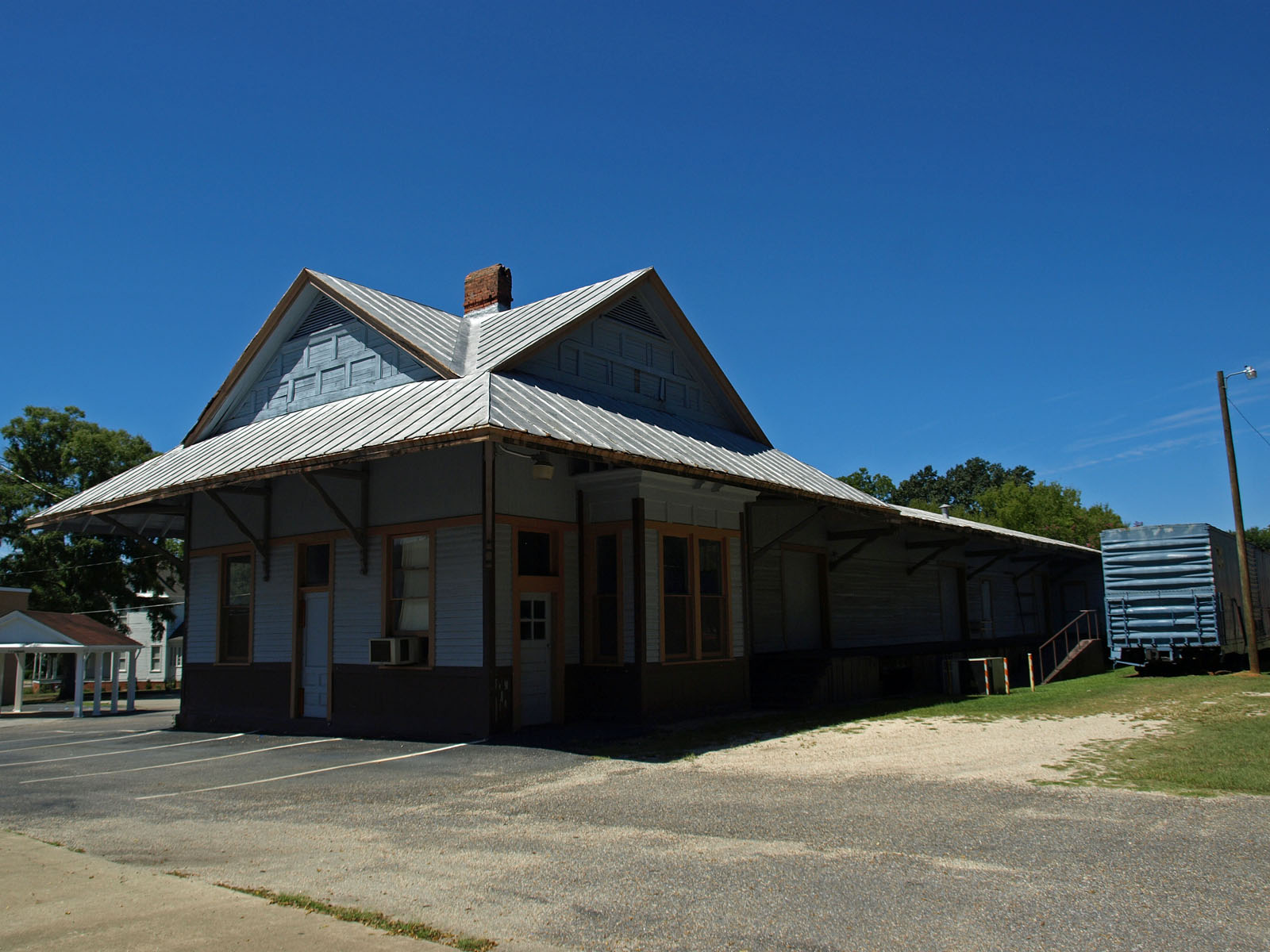
The Wetumpka L&N Depot was built in 1906 and placed on the National Register of Historic Places on July 1, 1975.

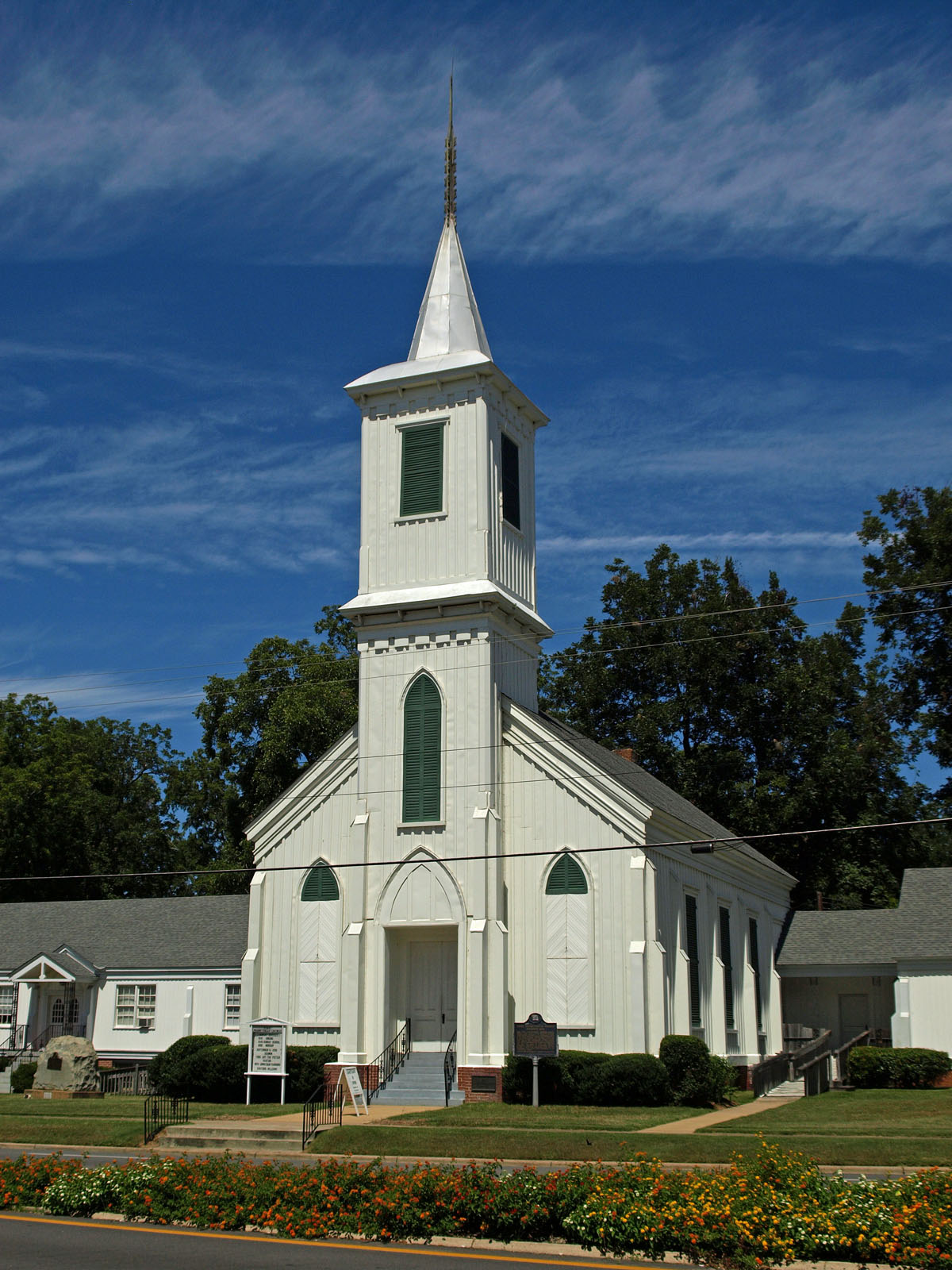
First Presbyterian Church of Wetumpka. Placed on the National Register of Historic Places on October 8, 1976.

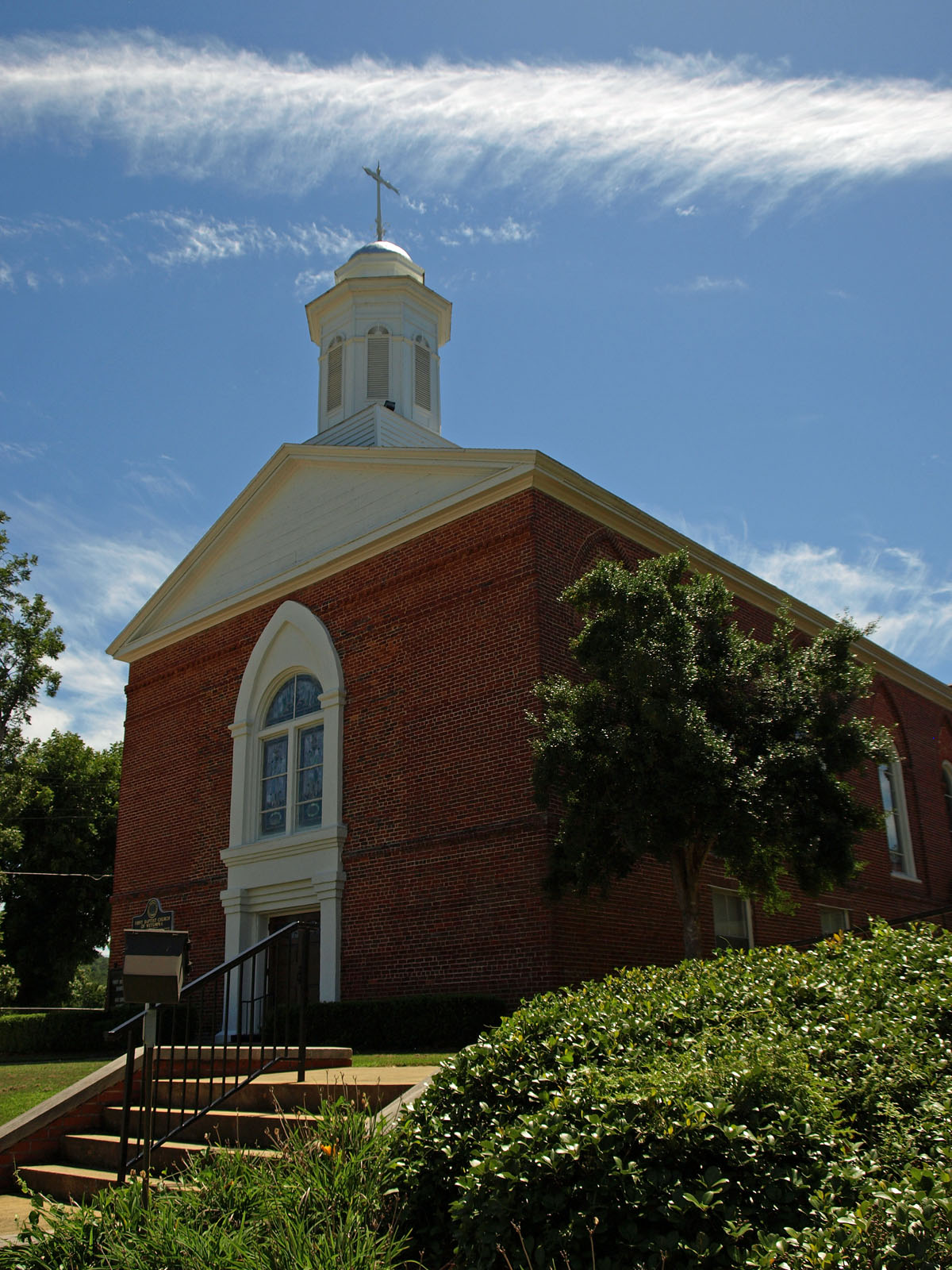
First Baptist Church of Wetumpka. Placed on the National Register of Historic Places on October 24, 2008.

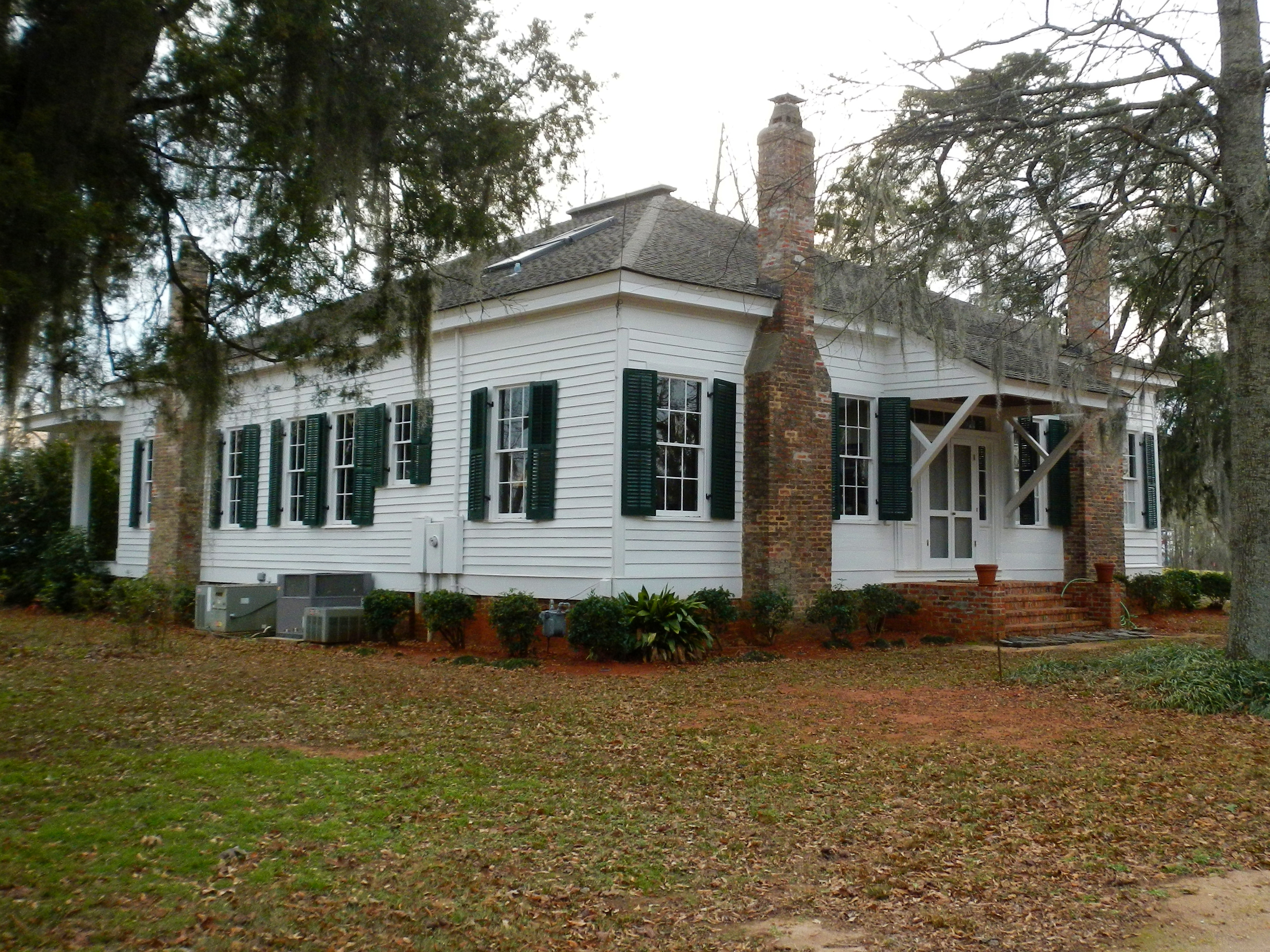
The Abel Hagerty House. Placed on the National Register of Historic Places on January 14, 2008.

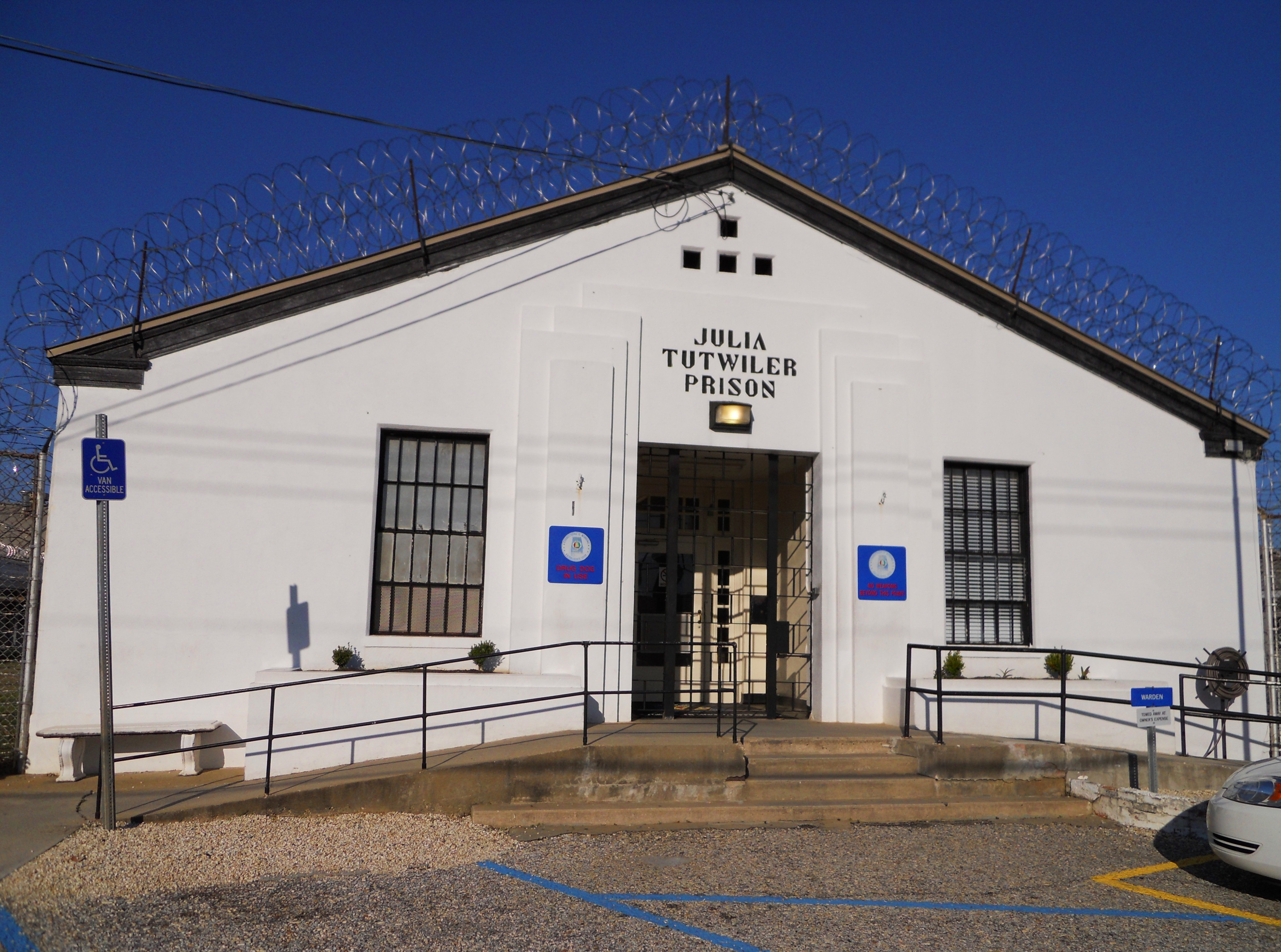
Julia Tutwiler Prison for Women is a maximum security prison located along U.S. Highway 231 in Wetumpka.

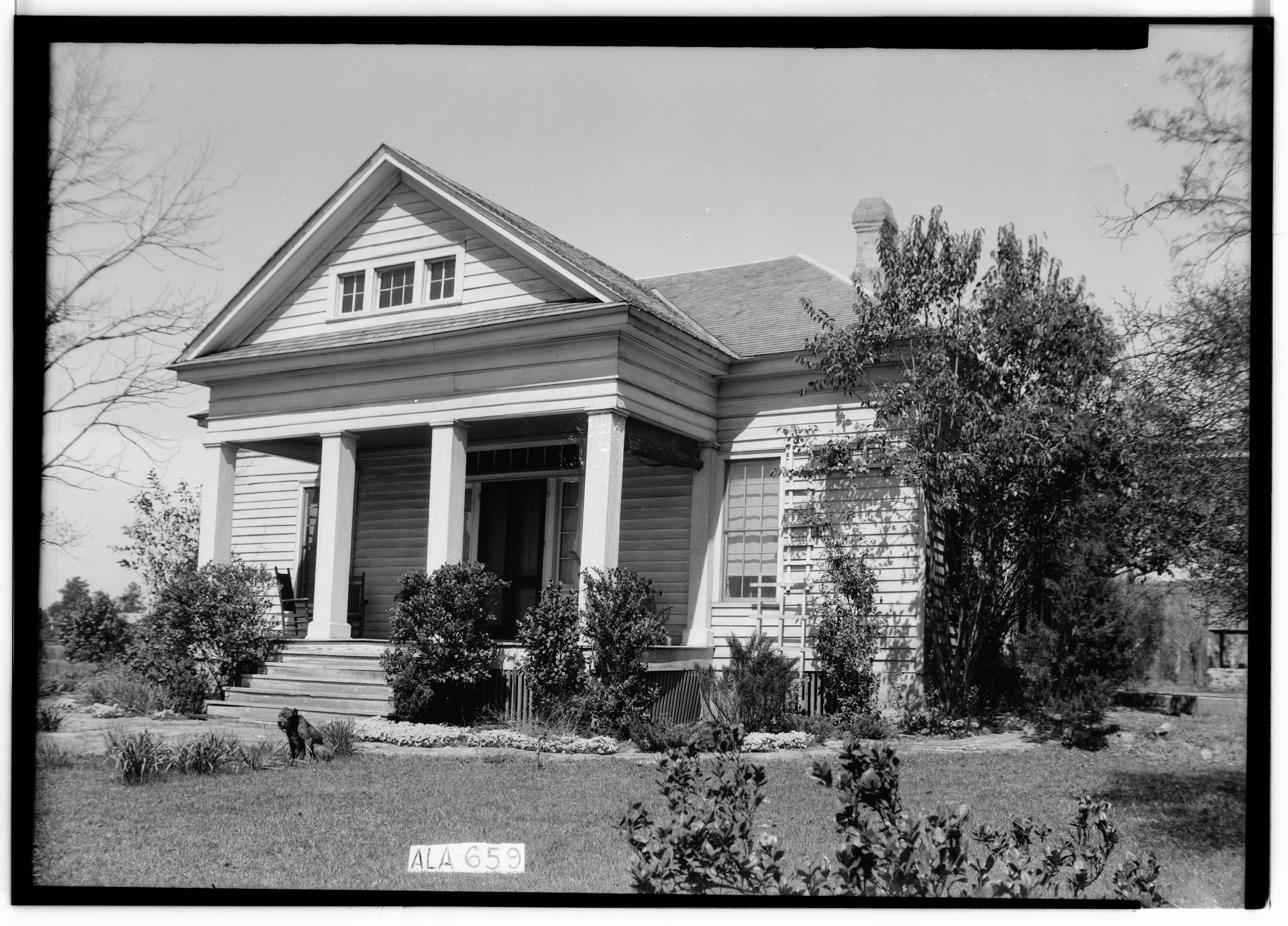
John Bruce Airey House, 1202 West Tuskeena Street. John Bruce Airey (9 February 1880 – 3 January 1968) was born in Evergreen, Conecuh, Alabama. His father was John D Airey and his mother was Elizabeth Mary Lock. He died in Wetumpka.

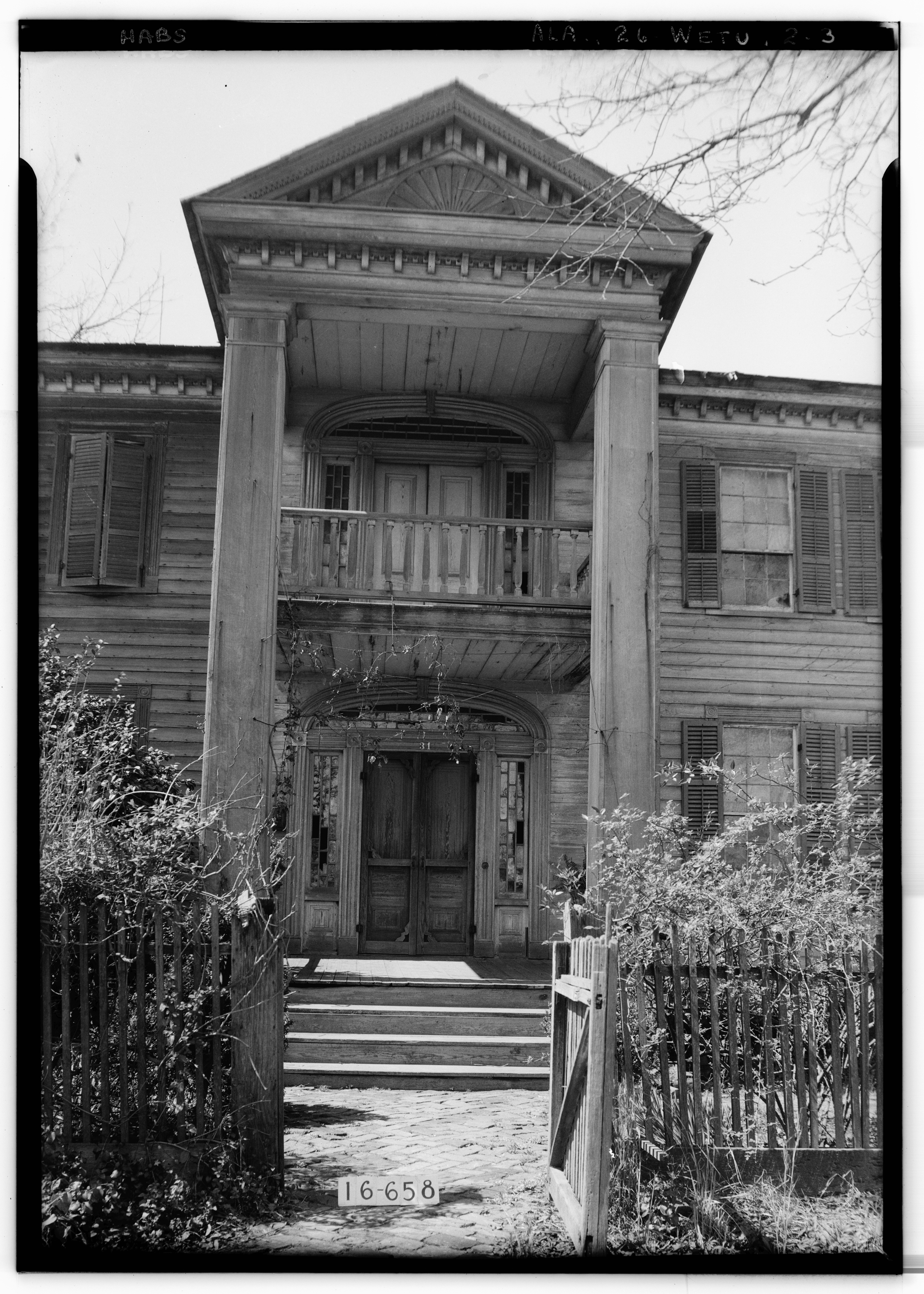
Kelly Fitzpatrick House, Autauga Street. John Kelly Fitzpatrick (15 August 1888 – 18 April 1953) was born in Alabama. His father was Phillips Fitzpatrick and his mother was Jennie Lovedy Kelly. He died in Wetumpka.

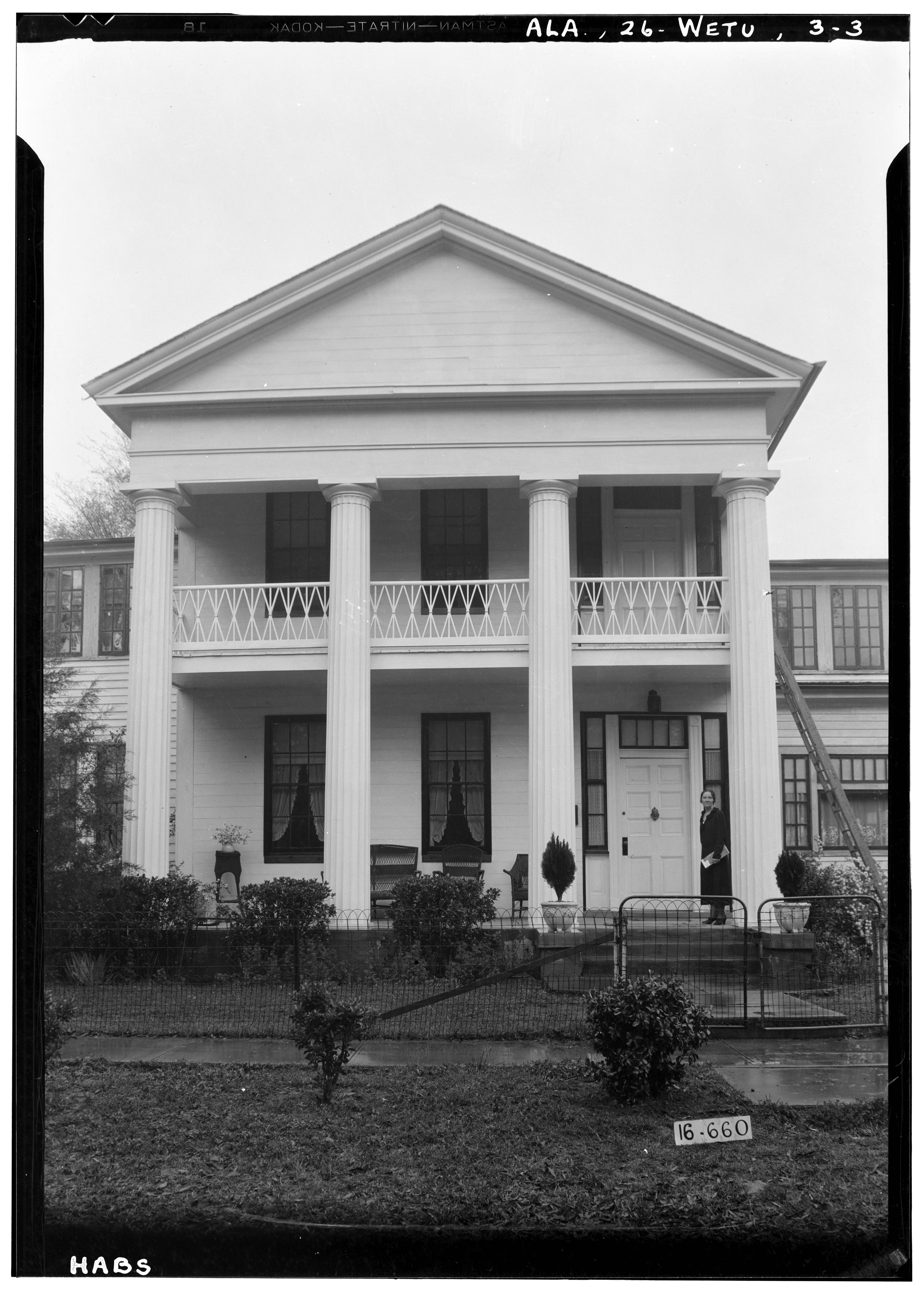
Paul M. Bates House, Mrs. Mary Jesse House (Bates-Jesse House; ca. 1830), 311 Government Street

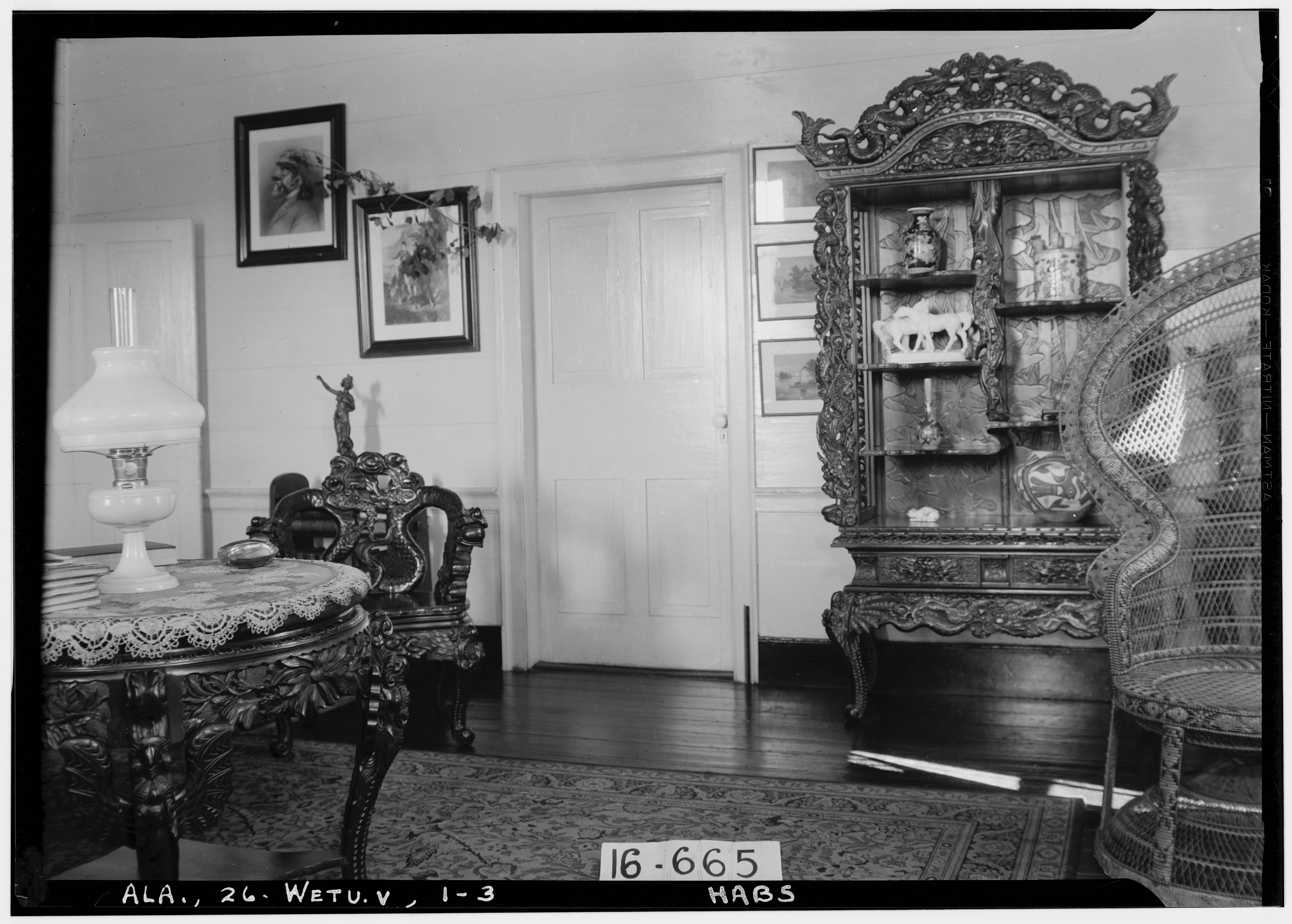
John Bullard House (1823), Harrogate Springs Road

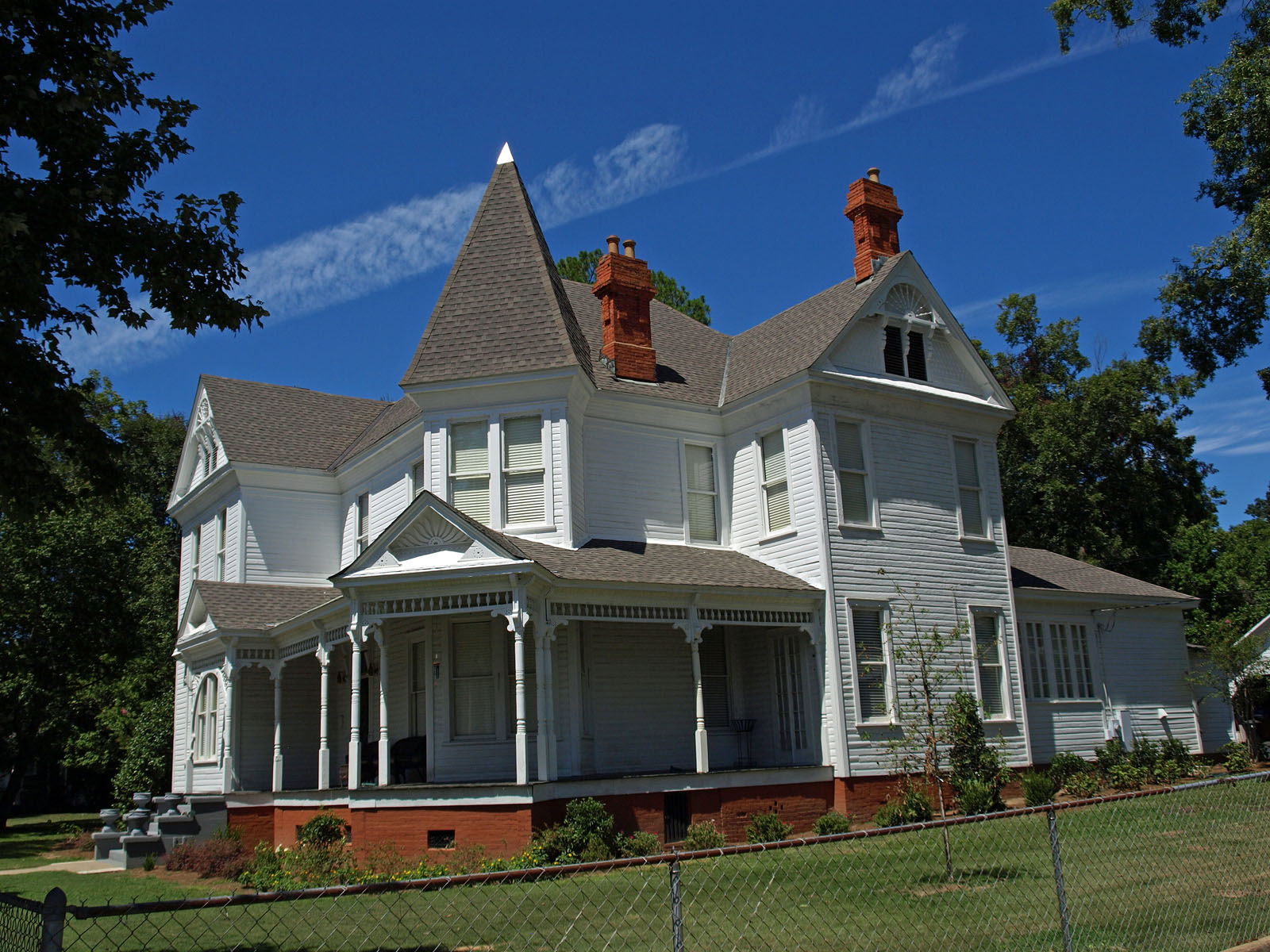
Benjamin Fitzpatrick House in Wetumpka, Tuskeena Street District is listed on the Alabama Register of Landmarks and Heritage.

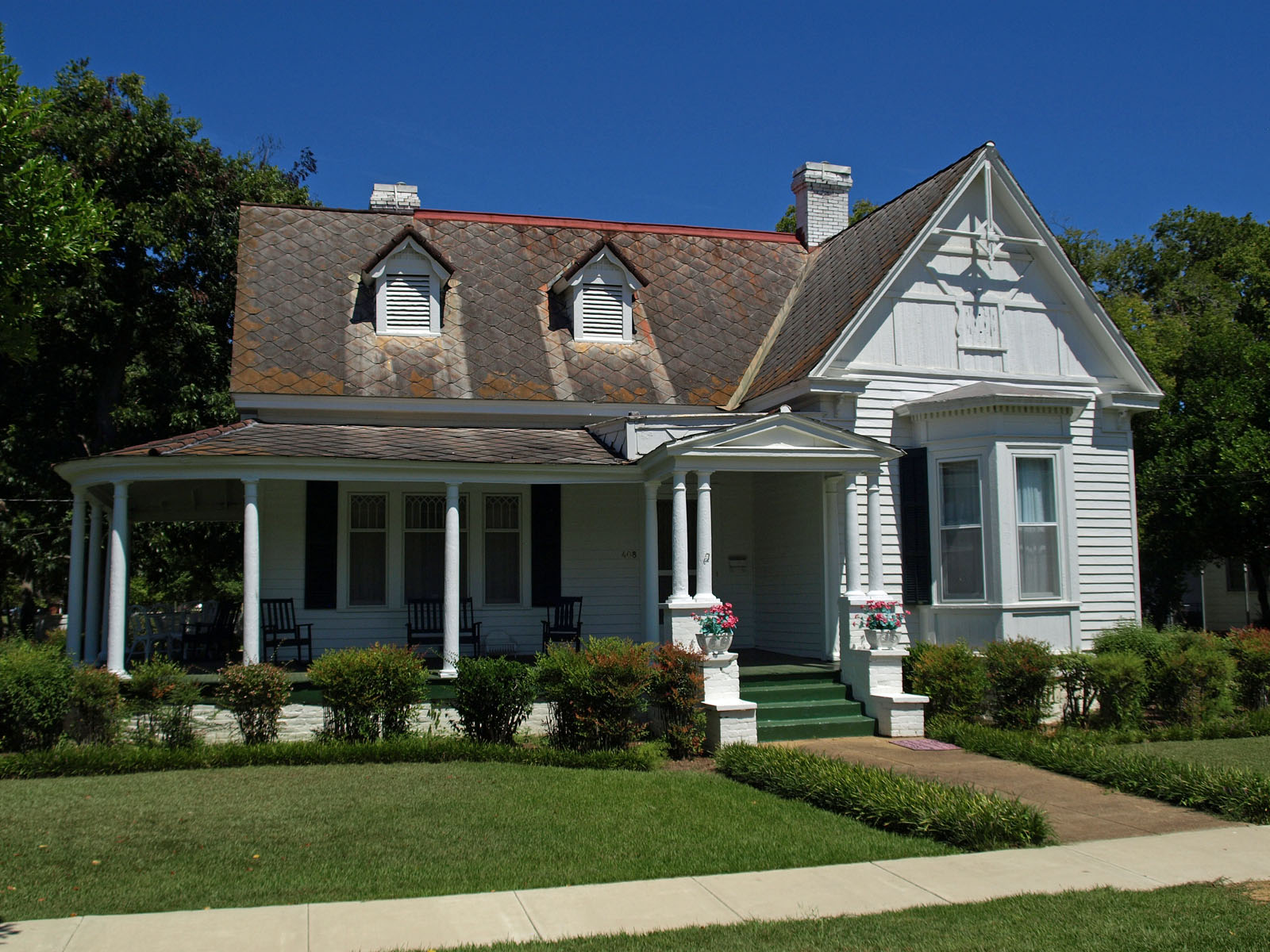
House, 400 E Tallassee Street, Tuskeena Street District is listed on the Alabama Register of Landmarks and Heritage.

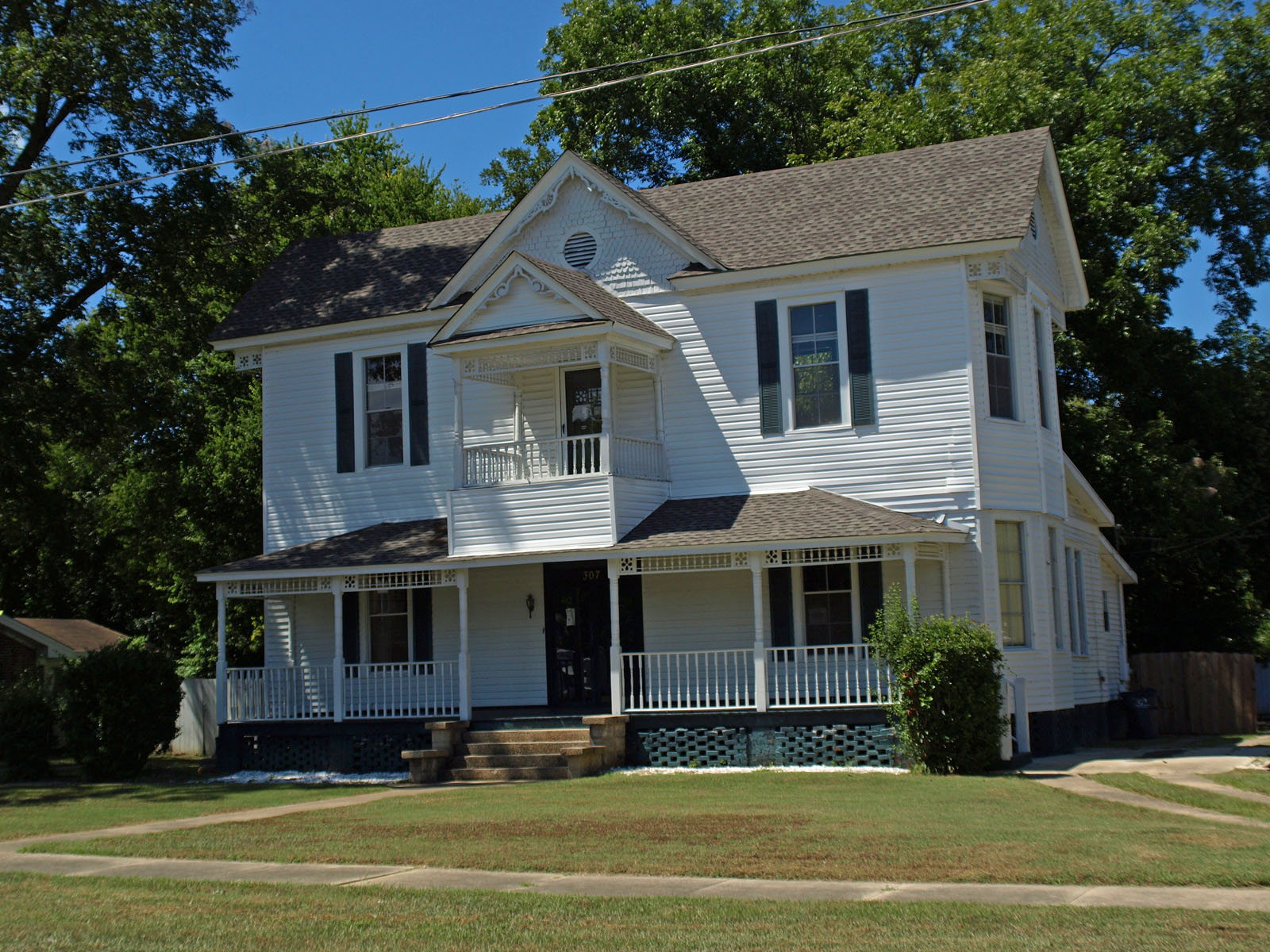
House, 307 NW Main Street

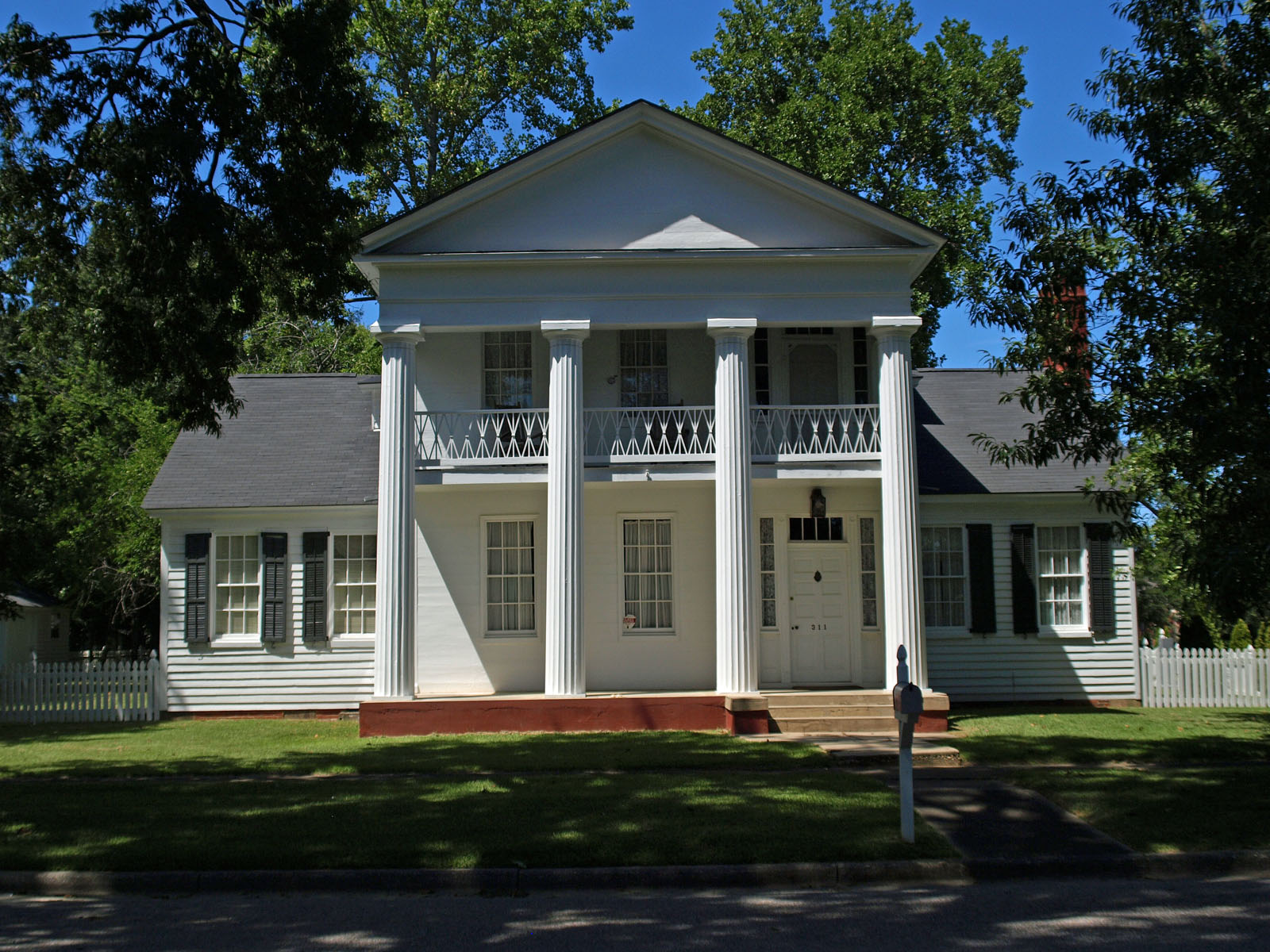
Florence Bateman House (Bates-Jesse House), 311 Government Street

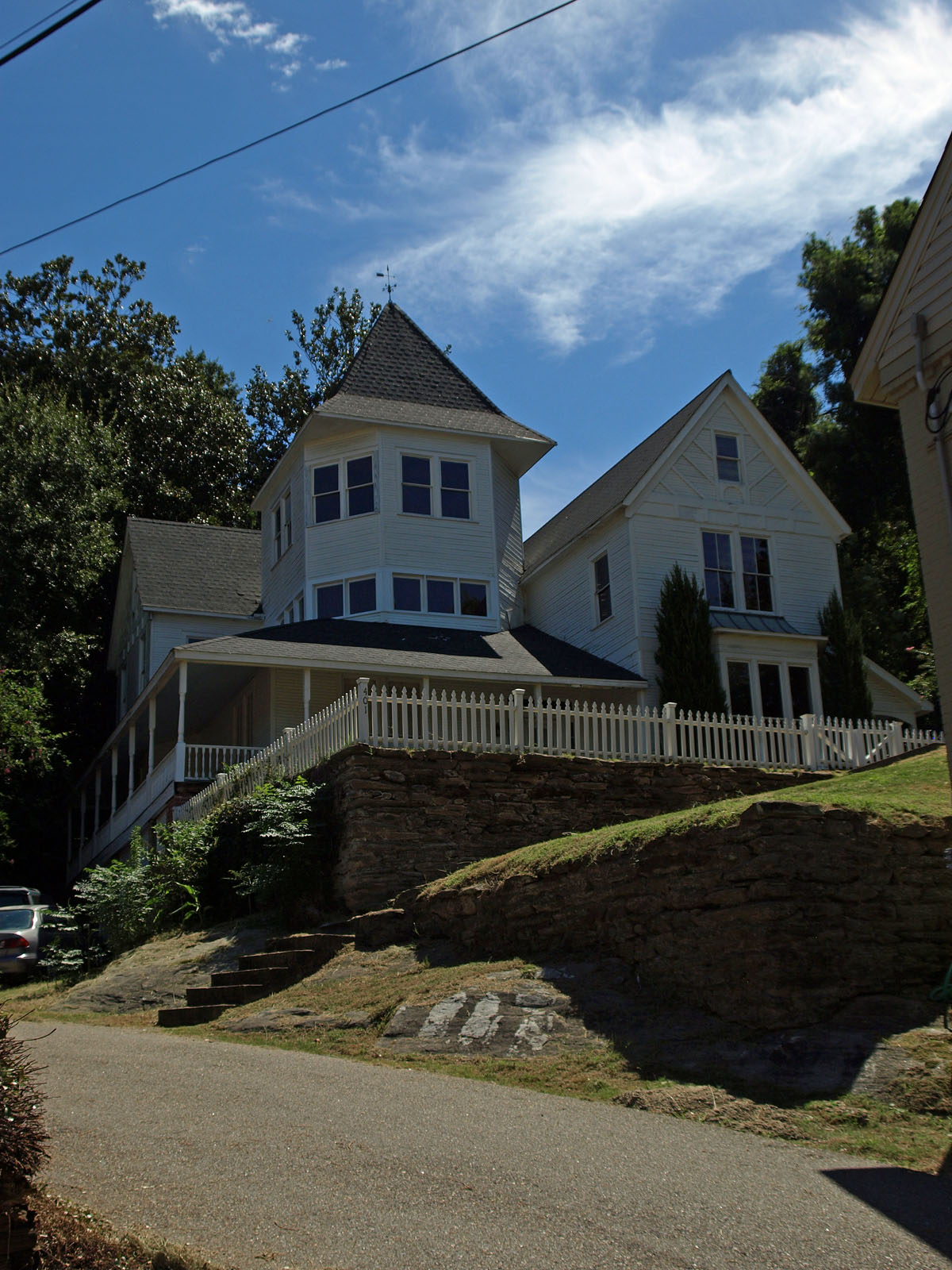
McCowen House
