= Wetumpka crater =

Impact crater in Alabama

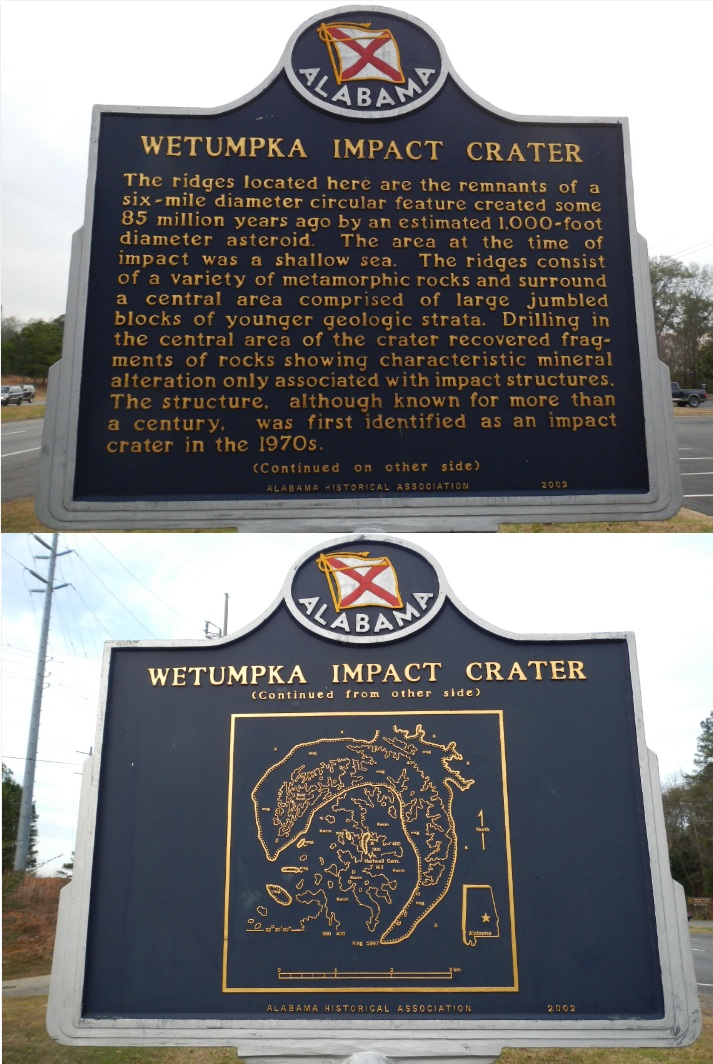
- Wetumpka Impact Crater historic marker

- Location within Alabama
- Location: Wetumpka, Elmore County, Alabama, USA; 32°31′N 86°10′W

Impact crater structure
- Confidence: Confirmed
- Diameter: 4.7 miles (7.6 km)
- Age: 81.0 ± 1.5 Ma
- Exposed: Yes
- Drilled: Yes
- Bolide type: Chondrite?

The Wetumpka impact crater is the only confirmed impact crater in Alabama, United States. It is located east of downtown Wetumpka in Elmore County. The crater is 4.7 miles (7.6 km) in diameter, and its age is estimated to be about 85 million years (late Cretaceous), based on fossils found in the youngest disturbed deposits, which belong to the Mooreville Chalk Formation.

The crater is well preserved, including the original impact rim and breccia, but exposures are few owing to plant and soil cover, and nearly all are on private land. The meteorite that caused the crater was estimated to be 1,100 feet in diameter and was likely to have impacted at a 30-45 degree angle from the northeast, on a shallow sea that was about 300–400 feet deep.

Thornton L. Neathery discovered the Wetumpka Crater in 1969–70 during regional geological mapping and published the first article on the subject in 1976. However, conclusive evidence of impact origin was lacking until 1998 when David T. King, Jr. and colleagues discovered shocked quartz in a core drilled near the center of the structure. In 2002, Auburn University researchers published evidence and established the site as an internationally recognized impact crater.
