= List of Alabama state prisons =

This is a list of state prisons in Alabama. It does not include federal prisons or county jails located in the state of Alabama.

== Major facilities ==
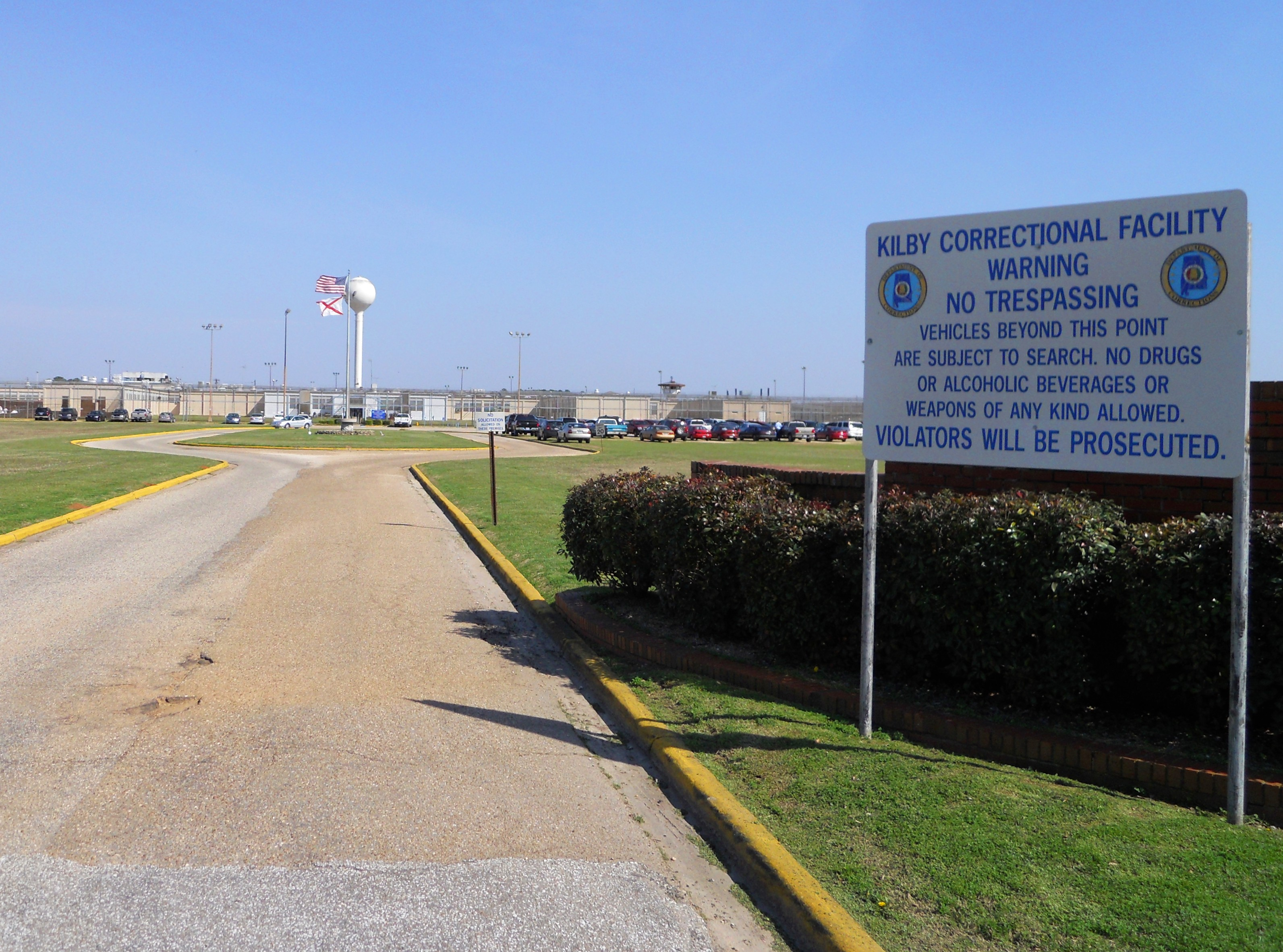
Kilby Correctional Facility

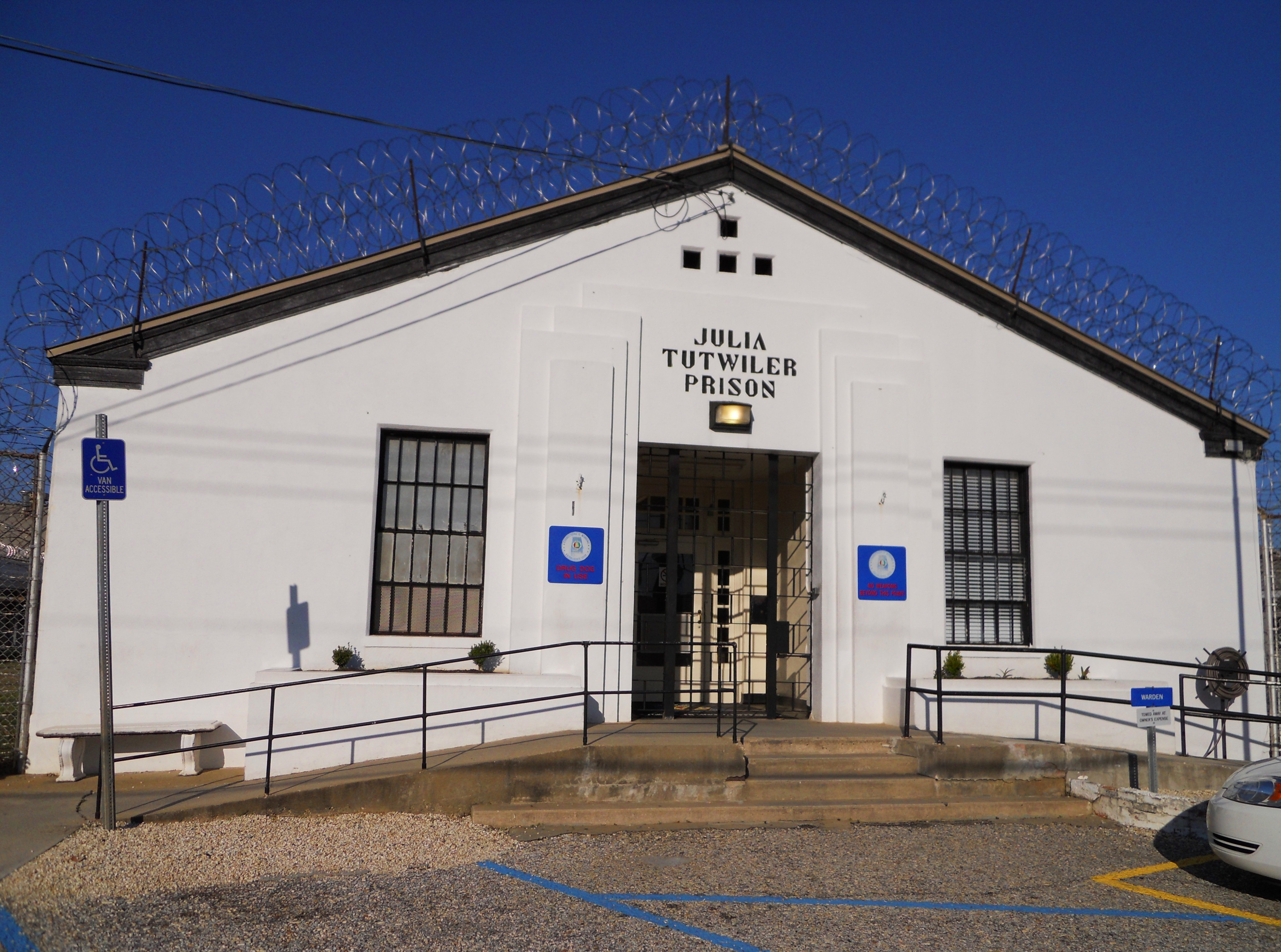
Julia Tutwiler Prison for Women

Prison	Photo	County	Location	Opened	Security class	Capacity	Notes
Bibb Correctional Facility		Bibb	Brent; 32°55′14″N 87°09′53″W	1997	Medium	1824	
Bullock Correctional Facility		Bullock	Near Union Springs; 32°08′54″N 85°40′20″W	1987	Medium	1658	
William E. Donaldson Correctional Facility		Jefferson	Near Bessemer; 33°30′50″N 87°11′05″W	1982	Maximum	1492	Death Row
Easterling Correctional Facility		Barbour	Clio; 31°41′21″N 85°35′07″W	1990	Medium	1267	
Elmore Correctional Facility		Elmore	Elmore; 32°34′30″N 86°19′13″W	1981	Medium	1176	
Fountain Correctional Facility		Escambia	Atmore; 31°09′07″N 87°28′06″W	1928	Medium	1255	
Hamilton Aged & Infirmed		Marion	Hamilton; 34°07′28″N 87°59′39″W	1981	Medium	300	
Holman Correctional Facility		Escambia	Atmore; 31°08′03″N 87°26′59″W	1969	Maximum	998	Death Row & Execution Site
St. Clair Correctional Facility		St. Clair	Springville, Alabama; 33°44′43″N 86°23′06″W	1983	Maximum	1,514	
Staton Correctional Facility		Elmore	Elmore; 32°34′37″N 86°19′59″W	1978	Medium	1,376	
Julia Tutwiler Prison for Women		Elmore	Wetumpka; 32°33′50″N 86°11′39″W	1942	Medium / Maximum	985	Death Row (female)
Kilby Correctional Facility		Montgomery	Mount Meigs; 32°23′13″N 86°06′10″W	1969	Medium / Maximum	1421	Receiving / Processing (male)
Limestone Correctional Facility		Limestone	Harvest; 34°48′45″N 86°48′14″W	1984	Maximum	2086	Largest prison in Alabama
Ventress Correctional Facility		Barbour	Clayton; 31°53′20″N 85°29′34″W	1990	Medium	1,650	

== Work releases, work centers, and camps ==
- Alex City Work Release Center
- Atmore Work Release Center (CLOSED)
- Birmingham Work Release Center
- Bullock Work Release Center
- Camden Work Release Center
- Childersburg Boot & Work Camp
- Childersburg Work Release Center
- Davis Correctional Facility
- Decatur Work Release Center (RENAMED - North Alabama Work Release Center)
- Elba Work Release Center
- Farquhar Cattle Ranch
- Frank Lee Youth Center
- Hamilton Work Release Center
- Loxley Community Work Camp
- Loxley Work Release Center
- Mobile Work Release Center
- Montgomery Women's Facility
- Red Eagle Honor Farm

== Former ==
- Wetumpka State Penitentiary, established in 1841 as the Alabama State Penitentiary

== See also ==
- The Alabama Solution – 2025 American documentary film
