= Murder of Scotty Joe Weaver =

2004 homophobic murder in Alabama, United States

- Scotty Joe Weaver
- Location: Bay Minette, Alabama, US
- Date: July 18, 2004
- Perpetrators: Christopher Gaines; Robert Holly Lofton Porter; Nichole Bryars Kelsay
- No. of participants: 3
- Motive: Homophobia, robbery
- Charges: Capital murder, robbery
- Convictions: Gaines: Capital murder (AIS: 00252809), Life without parole; Porter: Capital murder, Robbery I (AIS: 00254905), 2 consecutive life terms; Kelsay: Conspiracy to commit murder, 20 years, eligible for parole in 2013
- Convicted: Gaines: April 30, 2007; Porter: September 5, 2007; Kelsay: September 12, 2007
- Judge: J. Langford Floyd

Scotty Joe Weaver (March 26, 1986 – July 18, 2004) was an 18-year-old murder victim from Bay Minette, Alabama, whose burned and partially decomposed body was discovered on July 22, 2004, approximately eight miles from the mobile home in which he lived. He had been beaten, strangled and stabbed numerous times, and his body doused in gasoline and set on fire. It was one of only two murders in which the victim's sexual orientation was part of the motive reported in Alabama in the period from February 1999 – when Billy Jack Gaither was kidnapped, beaten to death, and then the body set on fire – and July 22, 2004.

The Baldwin County District Attorney, David Whetstone, stated that Weaver's sexual orientation was a factor in the crime. Whetstone commented on the brutality involved, stating that he believed the murder was premeditated and pointing out that Weaver did not die immediately and that his three assailants had time to stop. Alabama's hate crimes statute does not apply to people targeted because of their sexual orientation.

Three people were charged with capital murder and robbery in connection with the crime, two of whom were Weaver's roommates: Christopher Gaines, aged 20, Nichole Kelsay, aged 18, and Robert Porter, aged 18. Nichole Kelsay had been Weaver's friend throughout most of his life. Circuit Court Judge J. Langford Floyd ruled at a hearing in 2005 that the three would be tried as adults; Alabama law at the time stated that anyone under the age of 21 on trial for a crime could ask to be considered a "youthful offender". In March 2006, Floyd ruled in favor of Assistant District Attorney Jim Vollmer's request for separate trials for the defendants.

On April 30, 2007, Christopher Gaines pleaded guilty and was sentenced to life in prison without parole. He's currently serving a life sentence at the Limestone Correctional Facility. Porter pleaded guilty to murder and first degree robbery in September 2007, received two consecutive life sentences, and is currently serving his sentence at the Ventress Correctional Facility. Kelsay pleaded guilty and was sentenced to 20 years imprisonment for conspiracy to commit murder, with parole eligibility after six years.

In October 2004, the Westboro Baptist Church held an anti-gay "celebration" of Weaver's murder, as well as that of Roderick George, a gay man from Montgomery, Alabama. A peaceful protest rally was organized by Equality Alabama on October 16, 2004.

This crime was featured in Small Town Gay Bar, a 2006 documentary film depicting the difficulties of being gay in the rural South.
