= Tutwiler =

Tutwiler can refer to:

== People ==
- Edward Magruder Tutwiler, Alabama industrialist
- Edward Magruder Tutwiler Jr., college football player and coach, son of Edward Magruder Tutwiler
- Henry Tutwiler, educator and school founder; father of Julia Tutwiler
- Julia Tutwiler, prison reformer
- Margaret D. Tutwiler, politician

== Places ==
- Tutwiler, Mississippi
- Julia Tutwiler Prison for Women, a prison located in Wetumpka, Alabama
