= Bibb Correctional Facility =

Prison in Alabama, United States

Coordinates: 32.9207°N 87.1629°W

- Interactive map of Bibb Correctional Facility
- Location: Brent, Alabama
- Status: open
- Security class: minimum
- Capacity: 1,824
- Opened: October 1998
- Managed by: Alabama Department of Corrections

Bibb Correctional Facility is an Alabama Department of Corrections (ADOC) prison for men located in Brent, Alabama, United States.

The prison is located on about 250 acres (100 ha) of rural wetlands.

== History ==
The plans for Bibb began in July 1991, during the rule of Governor of Alabama Guy Hunt and Alabama Department of Corrections Commissioner Morris Thigpen. Construction began in 1993, during the rule of governor Jim Folsom Jr and ADOC Commissioner Tommy Herring. Construction continued in the years 1993 and 1994, during the Folsom governorship and the Herring rule of ADOC. In 1995, during the period Fob James was governor and Ron Jones was ADOC commissioner, construction stopped. Construction resumed during the rule of ADOC commissioner Joe Hopper. In July 1997 the state transported prisoners from the Elmore Correctional Facility and the Farquhar Cattle Ranch to the Bibb site in order to assist the construction.

During a period in 1998 the state transferred 300 prisoners to assist in the final construction and preparation of the Bibb facility. The state transferred 75 minimum custody prisoners to Bibb on May 28, 1998. The following day, the state transferred another 75 prisoners. The state relocated 150 prisoners to Bibb during July of that year.

The facility officially opened in October 1998, and during that month the prison took in 600 minimum and medium custody prisoners. During a period beginning on December 4, 2000, the prison received additional prisoners, with up to 100 prisoners arriving each day. Once the prison's capacity of 1,824 prisoners was reached, the transfers stopped.
