= Montgomery Women's Facility =

Prison in Alabama, United States

Coordinates: 32°23′16″N 86°06′03″W

- Interactive map of Montgomery Women's Facility
- Location: Mt. Meigs, Alabama
- Status: open
- Capacity: 300
- Opened: 1976
- Managed by: Alabama Department of Corrections

The Montgomery Women's Facility is a prison for women run by the Alabama Department of Corrections (ADOC). It is located behind Kilby Correctional Facility in Mt. Meigs, an unincorporated area in Montgomery County, Alabama. Opened in 1976, it has a capacity of 300 inmates; its warden is Adrienne Givens.

== See also ==
- List of Alabama state prisons
