= Christie Michelle Scott =

Convicted murderer and woman on death row in Alabama

- Born: August 10, 1978 (age 48); Alabama, U.S.
- Status: Incarcerated on death row in Alabama
- Motive: To collect insurance money through the death of her son
- Conviction: Capital murder (x3)
- Penalty: Death (x3)

Details
- Victims: Mason Scott, 6
- Date: August 16, 2008
- Location: Russellville, Alabama
- Imprisoned at: Julia Tutwiler Prison for Women

Christie Michelle Scott (born August 10, 1978) is an American woman convicted of the 2008 arson-murder of her autistic son. On August 16, 2008, Scott started a fire at her home in Russellville, Alabama, resulting in the death of six-year-old Mason Scott. After investigations revealed that Scott had bought a $100,000 insurance policy on her son the afternoon before Mason's death, Scott was arrested on suspicion of killing her son for the collection of insurance money. Despite her protests of innocence during her trial, Scott was found guilty of murdering her son and sentenced to death on August 5, 2009. Scott is currently on death row at the Julia Tutwiler Prison for Women, and her execution date is yet to be set.

== Murder of Mason Scott ==
Around 2:30 a.m on August 16, 2008, a fire broke out at the home of 30-year-old Christie Michelle Scott, who was present in the Russellville, Alabama house with her two sons. Scott's husband was absent at the time. While Scott and her younger son were able to escape the house and asked a neighbor to call the police, Scott's autistic older son, six-year-old Mason Scott, was found dead inside his bedroom, and the firefighters found his badly charred body after they successfully extinguished the fire. The fire was started intentionally by Scott, who had drugged Mason with cough syrup and put him to sleep before starting the fire.

An autopsy report revealed that Mason was still alive for a while before he died in the fire, given that there were soot particles found inside his lungs and throat and the high levels of carbon monoxide in his blood. Emily Ward, who performed the autopsy on Mason's body, certified that the boy had died of smoke inhalation and thermal burns.

After the case was transferred for investigations, fire investigators discovered a smoke detector, which was undamaged and should have alerted Mason, at the scene of the blaze. The device had been removed by Scott before she started the fire. Further police investigations revealed that Scott had a history of setting fires, including incidents at her father's and grandmother's homes. In 2005 alone, Scott's own house caught fire twice in one week, though arson was never confirmed. The police also uncovered that Scott had bought an insurance policy for both Mason and her younger son (Mason's brother) months before the death of Mason, and merely 12 hours before Mason died, Scott had bought a $100,000 life insurance policy for Mason. Scott had intentionally started the fire in order to murder Mason in order to collect insurance money with his death.

A month after she murdered her son, Scott surrendered herself to the police, and was charged with the murder of Mason on September 30, 2008.

== Trial and sentencing ==
On June 12, 2009, the murder trial of Christie Michelle Scott began before a Franklin County jury at the Franklin County Circuit Court. It was the prosecution's case that Scott had started the fire in order to murder her six-year-old son Mason and the motive was to collect insurance money amounting to $175,000 in total, and evidence adduced at the trial demonstrated that Scott had bought a $100,000 life insurance policy for Mason just 12 hours before she killed him. However, Scott denied in her defense that she had killed her son, claiming she was innocent and she did not know how the fire broke out.

On July 8, 2009, Scott was found guilty of three counts of capital murder: one count of capital murder of a child under the age of 14; one count of capital murder in midst of arson and one count of capital murder for pecuniary gain. Any one of these offenses carried a possible sentence of death or life imprisonment without the possibility of parole.

On July 11, 2009, the jury recommended that Scott should be sentenced to life in prison without parole, with five jurors voting for capital punishment while the other seven jurors opting for life without parole. The decision, however, was not final as the trial judge would decide whether to follow or not align with the jury's decision on sentence.

On August 5, 2009, Judge Terry Dempsey delivered his verdict on sentence. In his judgement, Dempsey found that the aggravating circumstances outweighed the mitigating factors, mainly that Scott had murdered her biological son for money and her own greed, and that the murder of Mason was "especially heinous, atrocious, or cruel". In his own words, Dempsey quoted about the case:

"Even if the victim (Mason) succumbed to smoke inhalation before being burned, it would still have been a horrible death. Struggling to breathe and trying to escape would be terrifying for the young child."

Rounding up all these above reasons, Dempsey stated that imposing the death penalty for Scott was "the only way justice can be served in this case". As a result, 31-year-old Christie Michelle Scott was sentenced to death by lethal injection for the murder of her son.

After the end of her sentencing, Scott was transferred to the Julia Tutwiler Prison for Women, where she became the third woman condemned to death row since 2002. In response to Scott's death sentence, residents of the Russellville community were surprised by the fact that the judge sentenced Scott to death despite the jury's decision for life. While some believed Scott deserved life in prison, some believed that Scott deserved to be executed for murdering her own son. Franklin County District Attorney Joey Rushing agreed with the judge's verdict, stating that the court passed the rightful sentence on Scott.

Scott was one of the last few inmates on death row to be sentenced to death by judges who bypassed the jury's recommendation via judicial overrides. In April 2017, Alabama lawmakers passed a bill abolishing judicial override, giving juries the final say on death sentences. Governor Kay Ivey signed it into law, but it was not retroactive, so Scott's death sentence remained. A later bill to apply the law retroactively was rejected by lawmakers. By May 2024, reports revealed that Scott was one of 30 inmates sentenced to death due to judicial override.

== Appeals ==
Shortly after Christie Scott was sentenced to death for the murder of her son, her lawyers swiftly filed an appeal for a new trial, although Scott was appointed with another lawyer to represent her in this appeal. The appeal was first heard in September 2009, before Judge Terry Dempsey denied the motion that same month.

On October 5, 2012, the Alabama Court of Criminal Appeals rejected Scott's direct appeal against her death sentence and murder conviction. The judges unanimously found that Scott had committed a "horrific murder" of her own son and hence described the death penalty as an appropriate sentence for her. Scott's lawyers expressed their intention to further appeal to the 11th U.S. Circuit Court of Appeals.

On September 26, 2014, Scott's second appeal to the Alabama Court of Criminal Appeals was also dismissed.

On April 20, 2015, Scott's appeal was denied by the U.S. Supreme Court.

On September 25, 2015, Scott filed a petition to challenge her death sentence and murder conviction on the basis that she had been represented by ineffective legal counsel.

== Death row and current status ==
Since the end of her sentencing, Christie Scott is presently incarcerated on death row at the Julia Tutwiler Prison for Women. Scott was one of five women sent to Alabama's death row between 2002 and 2016. Like Scott, the other four women – Patricia Blackmon, Tierra Capri Gobble, Lisa Leanne Graham and Heather Leavell-Keaton – were found guilty of murdering their children (whether biological or by adoption) or stepchildren.

As of 2025, Scott remains on death row for her son's murder, awaiting to be executed on a date to be decided.

== See also ==
- Capital punishment in Alabama
- List of death row inmates in the United States § Alabama
- List of women on death row in the United States § Alabama
