= Draper Correctional Facility =

Prison in Elmore, Alabama, United States

Coordinates: 32°34′38″N 86°20′14″W

- Interactive map of Draper Correctional Facility
- Location: 2828 Alabama Highway 143, Elmore, Alabama
- Capacity: 1232
- Opened: 1939
- Closed: March 13, 2018
- Managed by: Alabama Department of Corrections
- Director: Louis Boyd

Draper Correctional Facility was an Alabama Department of Corrections state prison for men located in Elmore, Elmore County, Alabama. The prison first opened in 1939 with a capacity of 600 beds, replacing the former Speigner Reformatory. Speigner had been founded circa 1900 and employed inmates on a farm and cotton mill on site. It was destroyed by fire in November 1932

Draper retains a farming operation and a furniture plant, as well as vocational training and employing inmates on facility maintenance. Each prisoner has an assigned job. It was named for Hamp Draper, the then-director of the state corrections department.

Elmore is the site of three Alabama state prisons: Draper, Staton Correctional Facility which is immediately adjacent, and the Elmore Correctional Facility about a mile to the east.
