= Kilby Correctional Facility =

Prison in Alabama, United States

Coordinates: 32°23′16″N 86°06′03″W

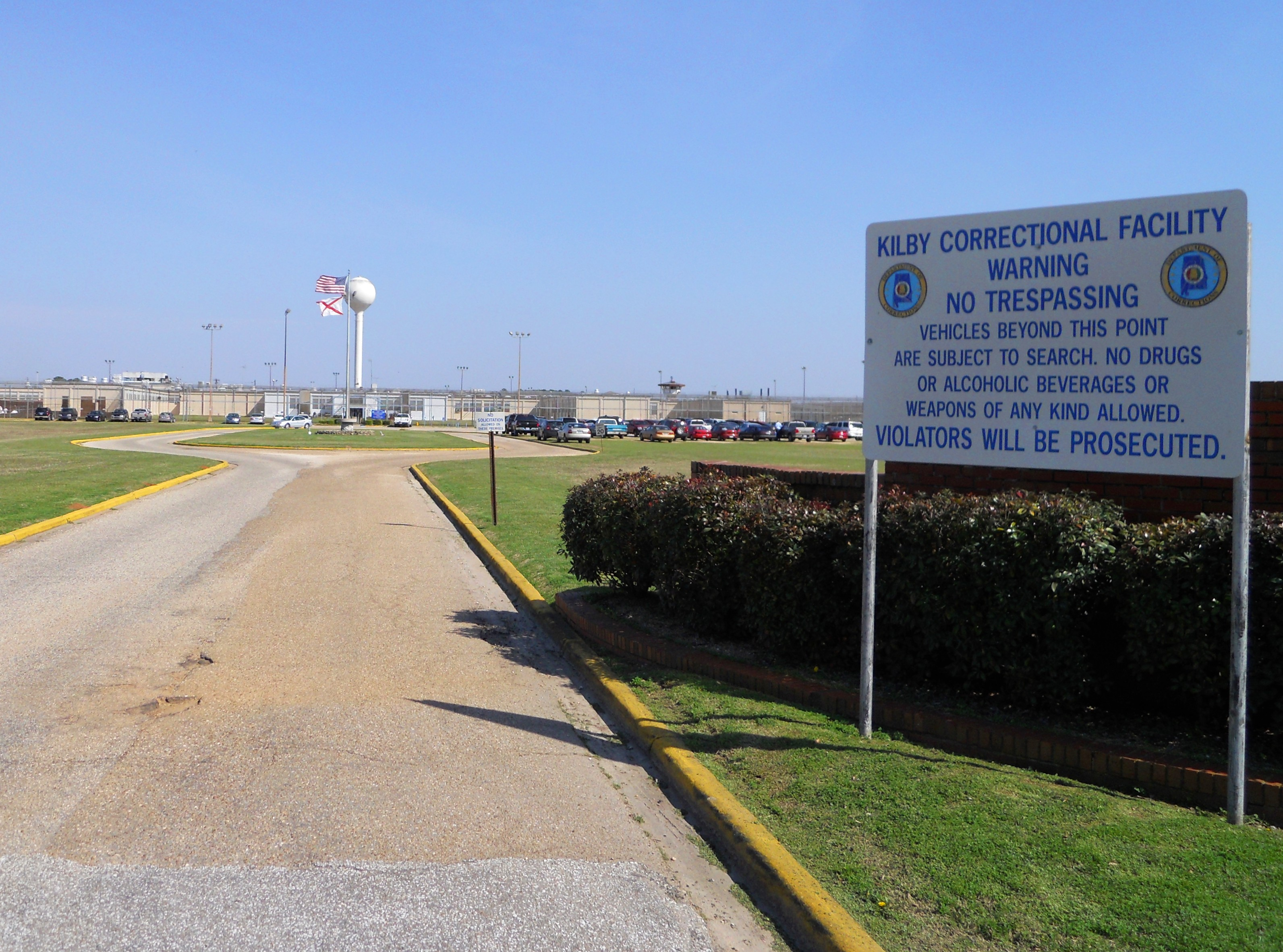
- Interactive map of Kilby Correctional Facility
- Location: Mt. Meigs, Alabama
- Status: open
- Security class: maximum
- Capacity: 1400
- Opened: 1969
- Managed by: Alabama Department of Corrections

Kilby Correctional Facility is an Alabama Department of Corrections (ADOC) prison for the state of Alabama, located in Mt. Meigs, an unincorporated area in Montgomery County, Alabama, with a capacity to house over 1,400 inmates. A section of the city of Montgomery covers a portion of the prison facility.

Kilby serves as receiving and processing center for all male Alabama state inmates. The current Kilby Correctional Facility warden is Phyllis J. Billups. The Montgomery Women's Facility, an ADOC facility for women, is located behind Kilby.

== History ==
In 1922 and 1923, the State of Alabama constructed and opened Kilby Prison, located on 2,550 acres (10.3 km^{2}) four miles (6 km) north of the State Capitol. It was named in honor of Thomas Erby Kilby, governor of Alabama (1919–23).

=== Electric chair ===
Kilby prison was the site where Alabama executed prisoners who had been sentenced to death, and when in the 1920s the method was changed from hanging to electrocution, an electric chair, "(Big) Yellow Mama", was constructed in Kilby. The chair was built by a master carpenter, Ed Mason, a man born in London, England, who had been convicted of burglary; he was convicted of having broken into six homes in Mobile to pay off gambling debts. After being promised a furlough or perhaps even parole by Kilby's warden, T. J. Shirley, he built the chair (4-foot (1.2 m) tall, straight-backed, weighing 150 pounds (68 kg)) from maple, and named it "Plain Bill" for Alabama governor William W. Brandon, who he hoped would pardon him. Mason was granted a furlough by Bibb Graves, Brandon's successor, and promptly left the state never to return. State engineer Harry C. Norman installed the electrical wiring; "once the switch was thrown, a prisoner would get a first fist-clenching jolt of power; the current would then reduce and automatically build back up to 2,250 volts for a second shot of electricity". A crown made of metal wire was fitted over the prisoner's head, with a wet sponge to conduct power, and a second, similar electrode on the lower left leg. Norman was to execute the first victim, Horace DeVaughn, convicted of two murders, on April 8, 1927, but refused and quit his job days before. DeVaughn was executed, but it took four shots of electricity to kill him.

On February 9, 1934, five men were executed in a span of thirty minutes: Bennie Foster, John Thompson, Harie White, Ernest Waller, and Solmon Roper. All were black. According to the Alabama Bench and Bar Historical Association, the majority of those executed in Alabama were black, and many lacked proper legal representation; others were mentally incompetent. The last man to be executed at Kilby was William Bowen, on January 15, 1965; executions then stopped while the U.S. Supreme Court debated the constitutionality of capital punishment, eventually overturning the death penalty nationwide in 1972, resulting in every inmate condemned to death having their sentence commuted to life.

=== Kilby razed and rebuilt ===
Deterioration after forty-five years led to the prison closing in 1970. The prisoners were moved to the new Holman Correctional Facility.

The new Kilby was established as the Mt. Meigs Medical and Diagnostic Center in December 1969 and had an original capacity of 440 inmates. Kilby was designed with an on-site hospital, dormitories, and one hundred two-man cells in order to facilitate its role as receiving center for all male prisoners held by the state of Alabama.

On 1 September 2016, a corrections officer was stabbed in the head by an inmate. He died three weeks later.

== Current facilities ==
Kilby is a maximum-security prison because it serves as receiving and processing center for male Alabama state inmates. It covers 154 acres, is monitored by five watchtowers, and is bordered by an 18-foot (5.5 m)-high chain link double fence topped with razor wire. Montgomery security and support personnel receive employee training on-site at Kilby. Alabama state dog tracking teams are also maintained at Kilby. The dogs are used by local law enforcement for tracking prison escapees, criminal suspects and missing persons.

Kilby Correctional Facility serves the Alabama state prison system with facilities for dental care, mental health care, general and specialty medical care. Inmate health and life skills programs are offered, including Narcotics Anonymous, Alcoholics Anonymous, Volunteers in Corrections, sex offender therapy, anger management therapy, alcohol and drug abuse counseling, individual and group mental health therapy, General Equivalency Diploma (GED) classes, Adult Basic Education (ABE) classes, and chaplaincy services. Additionally, Kilby grows its own fresh produce in correctional facility gardens, and runs a correctional industry printing and graphic arts plant.

== Notable inmates ==
- Bobby Frank Cherry, one of the conspirators in the 16th Street Baptist Church bombing. He was originally taken to Kilby for intake. Cherry was later transferred to the Holman Correctional Facility in Escambia County, Alabama. Cherry died in the Kilby Correctional Facility's hospital unit in 2004.
- The Scottsboro Boys, the nine African American youths who were arrested and sentenced to death for the rape of two white women in 1931, were transferred to the prison after the jury convicted them of the crime.
- Rhonda Belle Martin, a serial killer, was transferred to Kilby Prison twice, both before imminent execution dates. Martin was executed at Kilby Prison in 1957.
- Mike Hubbard (born February 11, 1962), former Republican Speaker of the Alabama House of Representatives. In 2016, Hubbard was sentenced to four years in prison for felony violations of state ethics laws. Hubbard reported to the Lee County Detention Center on September 11, 2020, and was transferred to state custody at the Kilby Correctional Facility infirmary on November 6, 2020, according to the Alabama Department of Corrections website.
- James Cobern, a convicted robber executed by the electric chair on September 4, 1964, for the robbery, rape and murder of his ex-girlfriend. Cobern was the last person to be executed for a robbery charge in the United States.

== See also ==
- List of Alabama state prisons
