= Julia Tutwiler =

American poet, educator and activist (1841–1916)

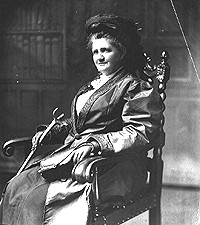
- Born: Julia Strudwick Tutwiler; August 15, 1841; Tuscaloosa, Alabama
- Died: March 24, 1916 (aged 74); Alabama
- Occupations: Educator, prison reform advocate
- Family: Martha Strudwick Young (niece)

Julia Strudwick Tutwiler (August 15, 1841 – March 24, 1916) was an advocate for education and prison reform in Alabama. She served as co-principal of the Livingston Female Academy, and then the first (and only) woman president of Livingston Normal College (now the University of West Alabama). She was inducted into the Alabama Women's Hall of Fame in 1971.

== Early life and education ==
Julia Tutwiler was born in Tuscaloosa, Alabama to Julia (Ashe) Tutwiler and educator Henry Tutwiler on August 15, 1841. Henry had been one of the first professors at the University of Alabama in the early 1830s, but at the time of his daughter's birth he was teaching at La Grange College in Colbert County, Alabama. Julia was born in Tuscaloosa, because her mother was visiting family there. She grew up in the nearby community of Havana, Alabama where her father established Greene Springs School, a college-preparatory school, when she was almost six. Henry Tutwiler was an early advocate of education for girls and so his daughters and some neighboring girls attended classes with boys at Greene Springs School. Julia then went on to study at a boarding school in Philadelphia for two years before the outbreak of the Civil War in 1861 necessitated she return to Alabama. (Henry Tutwiler's progressive views did not extend to enslaved persons and at the start of the War he was reported to own more than 40 slaves.)

Julia Tutwiler began attending Vassar College, in January 1866, during its inaugural year, but did not return in the fall. She furthered her education in Germany, France and at Washington and Lee University.

== Career ==
After her semester at Vassar, Tutwiler accepted a faculty position at Greensboro Female Academy, Greensboro, Alabama, in the autumn of 1866. The following year, she was chosen to be the Academy's principal—a position she held for two years.

Tutwiler served with her uncle as co-president of Livingston State Normal School. She was the first (and only) female president of the college. After decades of expansion, it became the University of West Alabama. With her support, in 1892 ten Livingston-educated students became the first women admitted to the University of Alabama. She was called the "mother of co-education in Alabama".

She was a key figure in the creation of the Alabama Girls' Industrial School, in October 1896. This institution eventually evolved into the University of Montevallo.

== Prison reform ==
Known as the "angel of the prisons," Tutwiler pushed for many reforms of the Alabama penal system. Most significantly, she fought to separate female prisoners from male ones and to separate juveniles from hardened adult criminals—resulting in the first Boys' Industrial School. In addition, she demanded better prison sanitation and helped institute educational and religious opportunities for prisoners. As a consequence of her advocacy, the Julia Tutwiler Prison for Women in Wetumpka, Alabama was named in her honor. For a period the Wetumpka State Penitentiary had been renamed after Tutwiler, prior to the opening of the current Tutwiler prison.

== Alabama state song ==
Tutwiler was known as a poet and wrote the lyrics for "Alabama", the state song, which was officially adopted in 1931. According to the Alabama Department of Archives and History, "The inspiration for writing the poem 'Alabama' came to Julia Tutwiler after she returned to her native state from Germany where she had been studying new educational methods for girls and women".

The song begins:

Alabama, Alabama,

We will aye be true to thee,
From thy Southern shore where groweth,
By the sea thine orange tree.
To thy Northern vale where floweth
Deep and blue thy Tennessee.
Alabama, Alabama
We will aye be true to thee!

== Honors ==
The Julia Tutwiler Prison for Women in Wetumpka, Alabama is named after her. In addition, a large women's dormitory at the University of Alabama and a library at University of West Alabama bore her name, though it was demolished in 2022. A new dormitory and parking structure, on the Alabama campus and still bearing her name, were built shortly thereafter.

When Judson College in Marion, Alabama, established the Alabama Women's Hall of Fame in 1970, Tutwiler was among the first group of inductees.
