= Equality Alabama =

Nonprofit civil rights organization

- U.S. State of Alabama
- Formation: 2002
- Type: 501(c)(3)
- Tax ID no.: 03-0442512
- Headquarters: Birmingham, Alabama
- Region served: Alabama
- Website: Official website

Equality Alabama (EA) was a statewide non-profit civil rights organization that advocates for the rights of LGBTQ people in Alabama.

== Background ==
Equality Alabama was formed by the 2002 merger of the Gay and Lesbian Alliance of Alabama and Equality Begins at Home of Central Alabama. The organization began to increase its activity prior to the 2005 referendum that banned same-sex marriage in the state. Representatives for the organization have stated that the additional visibility was in reaction to increasingly anti-gay legislation being brought forth in the state government. Proposed, but thus far not enacted, state legislation has included banning the adoption of children by LGBT people and prohibiting libraries from purchasing literature that portrays homosexuality as an acceptable lifestyle.

Following the U.S. Supreme Court decision in Lawrence v. Texas in 2003, Ken Baker of Equality Alabama told The New York Times: "Some people in our organization are very concerned about a backlash. We'll deal with it if it happens."

In 2014, Equality Alabama received public criticism for lacking diversity in its leadership and programs — particularly women, racial minorities, and transgender people. A former board member described a situation that arose after discussions about diversity that "turned sour." In the op-ed in The Birmingham News, Michael Hansen wrote, "The conversation ended with a white man explicating that he was perfectly capable of doing the work on behalf of minorities, women and transgender people."

== Opposition to Sanctity of Marriage Amendment ==
In 2005, when the state legislature voted to hold a public referendum on the Alabama Sanctity of Marriage Amendment, Equality Alabama's chair Howard Bayless said the legislators were "meddling into the lives of families. The government is deciding what our families are and what families are made of, and to me that's unconscionable." Before the referendum, Equality Alabama opened offices in Montgomery and Birmingham and sponsored programs to increase LGBT visibility and attempt to sway voters. The amendment passed, however, by an 81% margin in favor of forbidding recognition of same-sex marriages and civil unions.

== Affiliations ==
Equality Alabama partners with other human rights organizations. It is a member of the Alabama Safe Schools Coalition, a coalition dedicated to making Alabama schools into learning environments that are free from discrimination, harassment, and violence. Equality Alabama is also a member of the Equality Federation.

=== Vigil for Victims of Hate and Violence ===
The organization cosponsors the annual Vigil for Victims of Hate and Violence. The event is held to heighten awareness of the lack of hate crime legislation in Alabama that includes crimes based upon the perception of a person's sexual orientation or their gender. It is usually held on the steps of the Alabama State Capitol. Other cosponsors of the event include the Alabama chapter of the National Organization for Women, Alabama Safe Schools Coalition, Immanuel Presbyterian Church of Montgomery, the New Hope Metropolitan Community Church, the Montgomery chapter of Parents, Families and Friends of Lesbians and Gays, the Southern Poverty Law Center, and the Unitarian Universalist Fellowship of Montgomery.

The event was first organized after the brutal Sylacauga murder of Billy Jack Gaither, a gay man, in 1999. Gaither had his throat cut, was bludgeoned with an axe, and then his body was burned on a pile of tires. The Billy Jack Gaither Humanitarian Award recognizes "an individual or organization that has shown extraordinary courage in the struggle against hatred and contributed to the creation of a just society." This award is presented each year at the vigil. The 13th annual event was held on February 20, 2011. The 14th annual event was held on February 19, 2012, at the Montgomery Union Station Train Shed, rather than the usual venue of the Capitol steps, due to stormy weather. The first Stephen Light Youth Advocacy Award was awarded during the event. The award is named in honor of Stephen Light, an Alabama LGBT advocate who died in 2011 at age 25.

=== Road To Equality tour bus ===
In 2011 it partnered with the Human Rights Campaign, Auburn University at Montgomery's Gay–Straight Alliance, and PFLAG-Montgomery in sponsoring a "Road To Equality" bus tour that visited various cities around the state. It carried media presentations focusing on equal rights for LGBT people.

== Other activity ==
Equality Alabama filed a friend-of-the-court brief supporting the lawsuit brought by the Hispanic Interest Coalition of Alabama against Alabama's 2011 anti-illegal immigration law, the Hammon-Beason Alabama Taxpayer and Citizen Protection Act.

== See also ==
- LGBT rights in Alabama
- Same-sex marriage in Alabama
- List of LGBT rights organizations
