= Staton Correctional Facility =

Prison in Elmore, Alabama, United States

Coordinates: 32°34′39″N 86°20′13″W

- Interactive map of Staton Correctional Facility
- Location: 2690 Marion Spillway Road, Elmore, Alabama
- Security class: medium security
- Capacity: 1376
- Opened: June 1978
- Managed by: Alabama Department of Corrections
- Director: Leon Forniss

Staton Correctional Facility is an Alabama Department of Corrections state prison for men located in Elmore, Elmore County, Alabama. The facility opened in June 1978 and was named for Thomas F. Staton, former chairman of the Board of Corrections for the state. Staton, in a partnership with J. F. Ingram State Technical College, provides technical and vocational training for inmates in a variety of disciplines. In November of 2023, Daniel Williams was brutally tied up and tortured for days without the guards stepping in. Warden of the prison lied to the family about the cause being a drug overdose.

Elmore is the site of three Alabama state prisons: Staton, Draper Correctional Facility which is immediately adjacent, and the Elmore Correctional Facility about a mile to the east.
