= Limestone Correctional Facility =

Prison in Limestone County, Alabama

Coordinates: 34°48′44″N 86°48′16″W

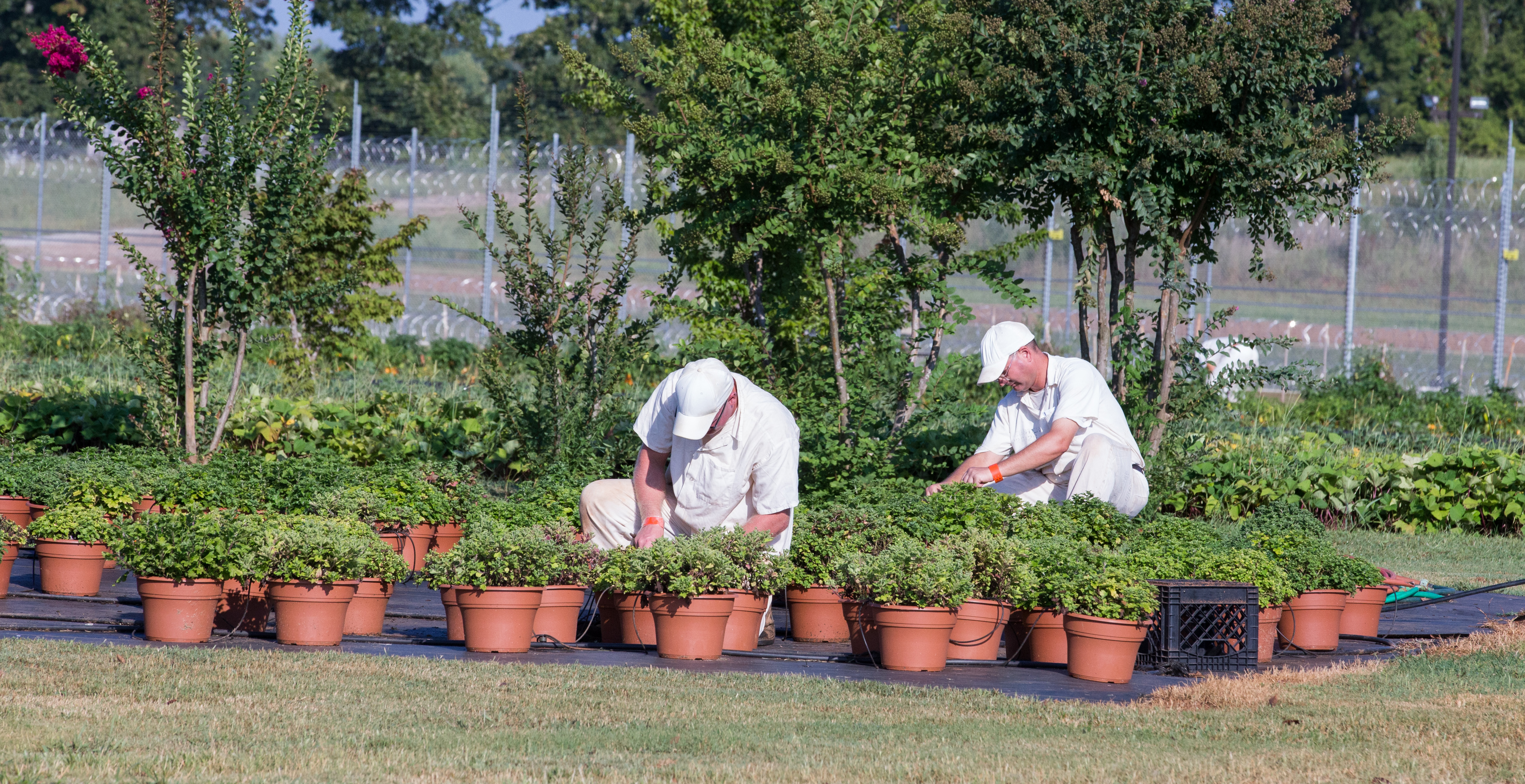
- Interactive map of Limestone Correctional Facility
- Location: 28779 Nick Davis Road Harvest, Alabama
- Capacity: 2086
- Opened: October 1984
- Managed by: Alabama Department of Corrections
- Director: Deborah Toney, Warden

Limestone Correctional Facility is an Alabama Department of Corrections state prison for men located in Harvest, Limestone County, Alabama. Opened in October 1984 and with a capacity of 2086 prisoners, Limestone is the largest prison in the Alabama state system. This institution is classified as a maximum security correctional facility. As of March 2024, the prison was 15% over capacity at 2,398 inmates.

Limestone and the Julia Tutwiler Prison for Women were the two Alabama state prisons in which HIV positive inmates were segregated, a practice that Alabama and South Carolina claimed stopped the spread of the virus and lowered overall medical costs. On December 21, 2012, U.S. District Court Justice Myron Herbert Thompson found that the segregation violated the Americans with Disabilities Act.

The prison operates a farming and cattle operation on its surrounding 1,600 acres (650 ha) of land.

Limestone has garnered media attention in the past several years for various controversies, including documented abuse and mistreatment of individuals in their custody, dilapidated and unsafe facilities, staff shortages, and corruption among leadership. Among these also include accusations of organ harvesting, as families of people who have died while incarcerated have discovered their loved ones missing various organs.
