= Howard Bayless =

American politician

Howard J. Bayless III (born 1965) is an American healthcare professional and politician from Birmingham, Alabama. On October 9, 2007, he was elected to the Birmingham Board of Education, making him the first openly gay man elected to public office in the state of Alabama. He did not seek re-election in 2009 but ran for Birmingham City Council against incumbent councilwoman Valerie Abbott, losing by 60% to 38%. His term on the school board ended in December 2009.

== Biography ==
Bayless was educated at Birmingham city schools, and he graduated from L. Frazier Banks High School in 1983. He went on the University of Montevallo and, years later, to University of St. Francis. Since 1989, he has worked at Bradford Health Services, a healthcare organization that provides substance abuse services to patients across Alabama and the southeastern United States.

A Crestwood resident since 1994, he ran in 2007 to replace Mike Higginbotham on the Birmingham School Board, representing District 3. Facing Earnest J. Lumpkin III, he won handily: gathering 4,059 votes (77.9%) to his opponent's 1,154 (22.1%). In so doing, he became the first openly gay man and only the second openly LGBT person elected to public office in Alabama (Patricia Todd had been the first, elected to the state House of Representatives in 2006).

He has held leadership positions in Equality Alabama, the Equality Fund of Alabama and the Equality Federation and has volunteered with many other organizations. Both his campaigns won the support of the Gay & Lesbian Victory Fund. In 2018 he moved to Indio California with his husband Peter Bonventre and is now an Administrator with Telecare Corporation.
