= Small Town Gay Bar =

2006 American documentary

- Directed by: Malcolm Ingram
- Written by: Malcolm Ingram
- Produced by: Andre Canaparo; Sarah Gibson; Matthew Gissing
- Starring: Jim Bishop; Bill Curtis; Rick Gladish; Fred Phelps; Charles Smith; Justin Williams
- Cinematography: Jonathon Cliff
- Edited by: Graeme Ball; Scott Mosier
- Music by: Natasha Duprey
- Production company: View Askew Productions
- Distributed by: Red Envelope Entertainment
- Release date: May 1, 2006
- Running time: 81 minutes
- Country: United States
- Language: English

Small Town Gay Bar is a 2006 documentary film directed by Malcolm Ingram that focuses on two gay bars in the rural deep Southeast United States, one in Shannon, Mississippi, and one in Meridian, Mississippi. The documentary was produced by View Askew Productions with Kevin Smith serving as executive producer.

== Synopsis ==
The story of community in the Deep South that is forced to deal with the struggles of ignorance, hypocrisy and oppression, Malcolm Ingram's Small Town Gay Bar visits two Mississippi communities and bases those visits around two small gay bars: Rumors in Shannon, Mississippi, and Different Seasons/Crossroads in Meridian, Mississippi.

Additionally the film visits Bay Minette, Alabama, to look at the brutal hate crime murder of Scotty Joe Weaver. The film focuses on a group of folks who are less concerned with the national debate over gay marriage than they are with the life risks they take being openly gay in small Southern towns.

== Cast ==
- Jim Bishop as himself
- Bill Curtis as himself
- Rick Gladish as himself
- Fred Phelps as himself
- Charles Smith as himself
- Justin Williams as himself

== Quotes ==
- Kevin Smith, executive producer of Small Town Gay Bar and also of "Silent Bob" fame: "It's a film that is a portrait of small-town gay bars in rural Mississippi," Smith said, straightening up. "Which is probably the hardest place in the world to be gay. It's a portrait of how people will create their own community, even in the middle of a community that ostracizes them and wants nothing to do with them. They can still collectively come together and create an oasis for themselves to just chill out and be themselves and be who they can't be in this particular buckle of the Bible Belt."
- David Rooney of Daily Variety Magazine: "Ingram illustrates how gay bars function as oases of acceptance and alternative families for his good-humored, enduring subjects."
- Philip Martin of Arkansas Democrat-Gazette: "Ingram's movie not only makes it clear that people can be brave and resourceful in the face of intolerance, they can also throw a great party."

== Soundtrack ==
1. "Rollin' and Tumblin'" by R. L. Burnside
2. "Tired Hands" by K.C. Accidental
3. "'Cause Cheap Is How I Feel" by Cowboy Junkies
4. "Mosquito" by Jake Fairley
5. "Anthems for a 17-Year-Old Girl" by Broken Social Scene
6. "Love Is a Place" by Metric
7. "A Million Dead End Jobs" by FemBots
8. "The Rainbow" by Ween
9. "The Transit Song" by FemBots
10. "What Comes After One" by FemBots
11. "Animals of Prey" by The Hidden Cameras
12. "At Night" by Jake Fairley
13. "We Oh We" by The Hidden Cameras
14. "Gay Bar" by Electric Six
15. "The Fear Is On" by The Hidden Cameras
16. "Small Town Murder Scene" by FemBots
17. "Broken and Blue" by FemBots
18. "I'm Still Your Fag" by Broken Social Scene
19. "Ban Marriage" by The Hidden Cameras

== Reception ==
Rotten Tomatoes lists five total reviews, and all of them are positive, giving the film a 100% fresh rating.

=== Awards ===
- 2006 Grand Jury Award winner at the Outfest: The Los Angeles Gay and Lesbian Film Festival for Best Documentary
- 2006 Grand Jury Award winner at the Miami Gay and Lesbian Film Festival for Best Documentary
- 2006 Nominated for Grand Jury Prize at the Sundance Film Festival
- 2006 Official Selection at the Sundance Film Festival
- 2006 Official Selection at the SXSW Film Festival
- 2008 GLAAD Media Award nomination for Best Documentary
