= Martha Strudwick Young =

American author (1862–1941)

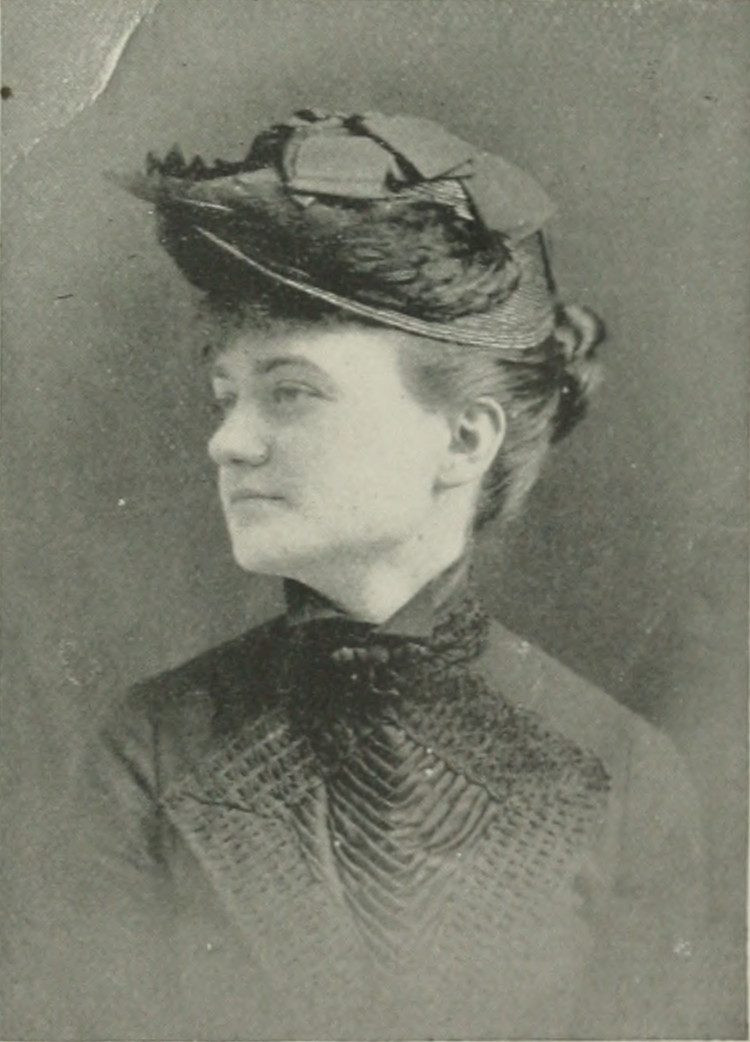
- Martin in A Woman of the Century
- Born: Eli Shepperd; January 11, 1862; Newbern, Alabama, Confederate States of America
- Died: May 9, 1941 (aged 79); Greensboro, Alabama, US
- Education: Livingston Female Academy and State Normal School
- Occupation: Writer
- Relatives: Julia Strudwick Tutwiler (aunt)
- Writing career
- Language: English

Martha Strudwick Young (January 11, 1862 – May 9, 1941) was an American regionalist writer, known for her recounting of Southern folk tales, fables, and songs of black life in the plantation era. She was admired by other writers for her skill with dialect. Young was inducted into the Alabama Women's Hall of Fame in 1986.

== Early life and education ==
Martha Strudwick Young was born on January 11, 1862, in Newbern, Alabama. She was the daughter of Confederate physician and surgeon Elisha Young and Anne Eliza Ashe (née Tutwiler) Young. The women's education and prison reform advocate Julia Tutwiler was her aunt. Her family moved to nearby Greensboro after the Civil War, and it was there that she learned the Southern folk tales and stories of African-American culture that would form the basis of her later writings.

Young was educated at the Green Springs School (which had been founded by her grandfather Henry Tutwiler as a school for boys), the Greensboro Female Academy, and the Tuscaloosa Female Academy before graduating from the Livingston Female Academy and State Normal School (later to become Livingston University and then the University of West Alabama). One of her teachers at the Greensboro Female Academy was the writer Louise Clarke Pyrnelle.

== Writing ==
Young wrote eight books, mainly collections of Southern folk tales, fables, stories, and songs, many of which drew on black culture and featured black protagonists. She was one of a group of regional writers who helped to popularize the use of dialect as an adjunct to realism, including George Washington Cable, Kate Chopin, Mary Noailles Murfree, and Joel Chandler Harris. Young, who aimed to preserve the tales and songs she had known as a child, has been called "Alabama's foremost folklorist."

Young began publishing in 1884 under the pseudonym 'Eli Shepperd' with a story in the New Orleans Times-Democrat. For more than 50 years she continued to publish stories as well as sentimental and religious poems in regional and national magazines and newspapers, including The Atlantic Monthly, Cosmopolitan, Woman's Home Companion, Metropolitan Magazine, Southern Bivouac, Detroit Free Press, and Southern Churchman.

In 1901, Young published her first book, Plantation Songs for My Lady's Banjo and Other Negro Lyrics & Monologues. It was illustrated with photographs "from life" by J. W. Otts. Young unmasked her identity sometime after this book was published, in an article in the Birmingham Age-Herald that was signed "Martha Young ('Eli Shepperd')".

Young followed up in 1902 with Plantation Bird Legends, which established her reputation as a leading writer of dialect tales. By the time of her 1912 book Behind the Dark Pines—which was a collection of some 50 stories about animals, including Br'er Rabbit—she was being compared to Joel Chandler Harris, who considered some of her dialect verse "incomparably the best ever written." She collaborated with Harris on a book; entitled Songs and Ballads of Old Time Plantations, it may never have been published.

Young also wrote stories and books for children, frequently with instructions on how to turn stories into performance games. She traveled around the country lecturing and giving readings from her books.

== Death and legacy ==
Young died on May 9, 1941, aged 79, in Greensboro, Alabama. An archive of her papers are held by the Hoole Special Collections Library at the University of Alabama. The University of West Alabama's Julia S. Tutwiler Library holds a small selection of her writings, including a notebook.

== Books ==
- Plantation Songs for My Lady's Banjo (1901; photos by J.W. Otts)
- Plantation Bird Legends (1902; illustrated by J. M. Condé)
- Bessie Bell (1903)
- Somebody's Little Girl (1910)
- Beyond the Dark Pines (1912; illustrated by J. M. Condé)
- When We Were Wee (1913)
- Two Little Southern Sisters and Their Garden Plays (1919)
- Minute Dramas (1921)
