= Bullock Correctional Facility =

Prison in Alabama, United States

Coordinates: 32°8′57.84″N 85°40′21″W

- Interactive map of Bullock Correctional Facility
- Location: 104 Bullock Drive Union Springs, Alabama
- Status: open
- Security class: minimum
- Capacity: 1658
- Opened: April 1987
- Managed by: Alabama Department of Corrections

Bullock Correctional Facility is a medium level security Alabama Department of Corrections prison in unincorporated Bullock County, Alabama, near Union Springs.

The prison has an honor/faith dorm and a mental health dorm, and facilities for administrative and disciplinary purposes. Prison programs include substance abuse, general education, mental health, and religious programs.

== History ==
The prison first opened in April 1987.
