= Havana, Alabama =

Unincorporated community in Alabama, United States

- Unincorporated community
- Location within Alabama Location within the United States
- Coordinates: 32°53′42″N 87°37′13″W
- Country: United States
- State: Alabama
- County: Hale
- Elevation: 404 ft (123 m)
- Time zone: UTC-6 (Central (CST))
  - Summer (DST): UTC-5 (CDT)
- Area codes: 205, 659
- GNIS feature ID: 159736

Havana is an unincorporated community in Hale County, Alabama, United States.

== Demographics ==
Historical population
| Census | Pop. | Note | %± |
|---|---|---|---|
| 1880 | 137 | | — |
U.S. Decennial Census

Havana was listed on the 1880 U.S. Census as an unincorporated community with a population of 137. It was the only time it was listed on the census rolls.

== Notable people ==
- Joseph Neely Powers, chancellor of the University of Mississippi from 1914 to 1924, and from 1930 to 1932
- Henry Tutwiler, 19th century founder of the Greene Springs School for Boys just outside Havana
- Julia Tutwiler, 19th century education and prison reform advocate
