= Wetumpka State Penitentiary =

Former prison in Alabama, United States

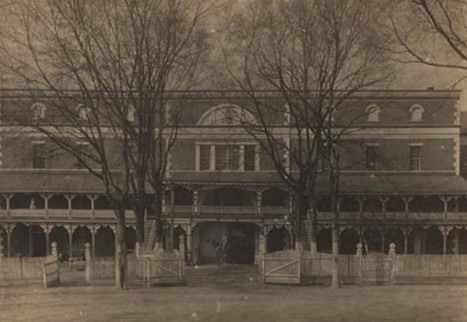
- Main building at the turn of the 20th century
- Interactive map of Wetumpka State Penitentiary
- Location: Wetumpka, Alabama; 32°33′2″N 86°11′28″W
- Status: Closed
- Opened: 1842
- Closed: 1942
- Alabama State Penitentiary
- U.S. National Register of Historic Places
- Area: 3 acres (1 ha)
- Built: 1839–41
- Architect: W.H. Thomas
- NRHP reference No.: 73000342
- Added to NRHP: May 8, 1973

The Wetumpka State Penitentiary (WSP), originally known as the Alabama State Penitentiary, was the first state prison established in Alabama, United States. Built on the east bank of the Coosa River in Wetumpka, it was nicknamed the "Walls of Alabama" or "Walls". For much of its operation, the prison housed both men and women, kept in separate sections of the prison.

For a period beginning in the 1920s this prison was used exclusively for women. After a new women's prison was opened a mile away in 1942, the state housed fewer prisoners at the aging Wetumpka facility. It began to sell off parcels of land. The historic site was added to the National Register of Historic Places on May 8, 1973. All buildings on the site have been demolished since the late 20th century.

== History ==
On January 26, 1839, the Alabama Legislature, under Governor of Alabama Arthur P. Bagby, enacted a criminal code that authorized the creation of the first prison in Alabama. On August 21 of that year the state purchased a site along the Coosa River in Wetumpka, as the site was centrally located within the state. Bagby placed the first cornerstone of the prison in October of that year. By 1841 the $84,889 prison was completed. It had 208 cells and was surrounded by 25-foot (760 cm) walls. The first prisoner entered the prison in 1842.

In 1922 Wetumpka was converted to serve exclusively as a women's prison.

A fire destroyed a portion of the Wetumpka prison on January 23, 1931; within 40 days after the fire, the department had restored functionality in the facility. After a fire at the Speigner prison on November 28, 1932, Wetumpka housed the convicts from Speigner until December 26, 1932, when temporary buildings were opened at Speigner opened.

In 1941 the prison was renamed as the Julia Tutwiler Prison. It was used mostly for female prisoners. In December 1942 a new Julia Tutwiler Prison for Women opened, built less than a mile north of the Wetumpka State Penitentiary. The previous Wetumpka prison's usage decreased. Beginning in 1945 the State of Alabama began selling small parcels of the older prison land. In 1973 the prison and site were listed on the National Register of Historic Places. Several buildings survived to the last decades of the 20th century, but have since been demolished.
