= Elmore Correctional Facility =

Prison in Alabama, United States

Coordinates: 32°34′31″N 86°19′13″W

- Interactive map of Elmore Correctional Facility
- Location: 3520 Marion Spillway Road Elmore, Alabama
- Status: open
- Security class: minimum security
- Capacity: 1176
- Opened: 1981
- Managed by: Alabama Department of Corrections

Elmore Correctional Facility is a medium-security prison for men, located in Elmore, Elmore County, Alabama. The facility has an operating capacity of 1176 and was first opened in 1981 with temporary modular dormitories.

Elmore is the site of three Alabama state prisons: Staton Correctional Facility and Draper Correctional Facility, which are adjacent to one another, and Elmore about a mile to the east.

Elmore inmate Johnny Lee Spears was stabbed to death by another prisoner on March 25, 2016, and another prisoner was stabbed and wounded in April. In July a third inmate was killed, stabbed by another prisoner. In July 2006, an additional 400 beds were added, bringing the total capacity to 1,264 inmates and was critically understaffed, with 72 of its 169 guard positions filled.
