= Hispanic Interest Coalition of Alabama =

The Hispanic Interest Coalition of Alabama (¡HICA!) is a non-profit organization, created in 1999, which aims to improve the quality of life for Latinos living in Alabama.

HICA was founded by Isabel Rubio.
