= Henry Tutwiler =

Educator

Henry Tutwiler (November 16, 1807 – September 20, 1884) was an American educator who founded a school for boys near Greensboro, Alabama.

== Biography ==
Tutwiler was born in Harrisonburg, Virginia, in the Shenandoah Valley in 1807. He entered the first class of the University of Virginia, and following graduation with a master's degree in 1831 became a professor at the University of Alabama in Tuscaloosa. While in Tuscaloosa, he was a member of the Alabama Colonization Society, and he delivered an address to the student literary societies. It is possible that Tutwiler's departure from the university was related to his anti-slavery views.

In 1835 he married Julia Ashe (1820-1883). They had eleven children; one of their daughters, Julia Tutwiler, became an important educator and advocate of prison reform in Alabama. Their granddaughter Martha Strudwick Young was an American regionalist writer.

In 1847 he founded a private school for boys, the Greene Springs School for Boys near Havana, Alabama, in what was then Greene County. The school gained a high reputation for the quality of its instruction and because of Tutwiler's decision, unusual for the time, to admit a few young women—including his daughters.
