= Ventress Correctional Facility =

Prison in Clayton, Alabama, United States

Coordinates: 31°53′21″N 85°29′31″W

- Interactive map of Ventress Correctional Facility
- Location: Ventress Lane, Clayton, Alabama
- Security class: medium security and below
- Capacity: 1650
- Opened: August 1990
- Managed by: Alabama Department of Corrections
- Director: Christopher Gordy

Ventress Correctional Facility is an Alabama Department of Corrections state prison for men located in Clayton, Barbour County, Alabama. Opened in August 1990 with a capacity for 1650 inmates, Ventress was the state's first correctional facility dedicated to drug and alcohol treatment as its primary mission.

In August 2010 inmate Rocrast Mack was beaten by at least four corrections officers for 40 minutes in three locations within the prison. An FBI investigation revealed that Mack's fatal injuries did not match up with the officers' testimony. Four officers were convicted and imprisoned on civil rights and conspiracy charges, with the apparent ringleader given 30 years.

In late 2018, two guards were charged with smuggling contraband in the facility in exchange for cash.
