= DeBlase children murders =

2010 child abuse and murders of two children

Natalie DeBlase
- Born: Natalie Alexis DeBlase; November 4, 2005; Alabama, U.S.
- Died: March 4, 2010 (aged 4); Alabama, U.S.
- Cause of death: Unknown, but presumed homicidal violence

Chase DeBlase
- Born: Jonathan Chase DeBlase; December 29, 2006; Alabama, U.S.
- Died: June 20, 2010 (aged 3); Alabama, U.S.

The DeBlase children murders were an infanticide that occurred over a three-month period between March 4, 2010 and June 20, 2010, when two young children, Natalie Alexis DeBlase (November 4, 2005 – March 4, 2010) and Jonathan Chase DeBlase (December 29, 2006 – June 20, 2010), aged four and three respectively, were murdered by their father and stepmother, John Joseph DeBlase (born 1983) and Heather Leavell-Keaton (born 1988), who had abused the two children for several months before their deaths.

The couple were arrested in December 2010 on suspicion for the disappearance of the two children, which thus brought the murders into revelation. The bodies of both Chase and Natalie were eventually discovered by the police in Mississippi and Alabama respectively. The couple were eventually convicted of murdering the children and sentenced to death in separate trials between 2014 and 2015.

Currently, DeBlase is incarcerated on death row at the Holman Correctional Facility while Leavell-Keaton is held on death row at the Julia Tutwiler Prison for Women. Both are awaiting their executions, which are yet to be scheduled as of 2026.

== Background and murders ==
Natalie Alexis DeBlase and Jonathan Chase DeBlase were born on November 4, 2005, and December 29, 2006, respectively, in Alabama, to Corrine Heathcock and John Joseph DeBlase. Prior to his marriage, DeBlase grew up in a relatively normal family in Mobile, Alabama, and he enrolled in public schools before he completed high school and graduated in 2003. DeBlase worked in several jobs and later married Heathcock, with whom he had both Natalie and Chase, but the marriage itself was riddled with conflicts and eventually, the couple divorced and DeBlase gained custody of the children in June 2009.

According to Heathcock, who last saw her children on November 17, 2009, she was unable to provide for her children and hence, the custody for the two children were granted to her ex-husband, whom she described to be a good and caring father to both Natalie and Chase. Meanwhile, after the divorce, DeBlase began a relationship with Heather Leavell-Keaton, who was a visually-impaired scholarship holder and undergraduate student at Spring Hill College. The couple entered a common-law marriage and began to live together with DeBlase's children.

According to several witnesses, it was observed that the children were subjected to mistreatment by the couple. On one occasion, when the DeBlases and Leavell-Keaton attended a cook-out at a friend's trailer, the friend saw Leavell-Keaton screaming and cursing the children and roughly grabbing Natalie, and the friend intervened and warned Leavell-Keaton to not go out of line in her treatment of the children or risk getting reported to the police; DeBlase reportedly did not stop the abuse. On another occasion, during a friend's birthday party, Chase was observed to be extremely hungry and later suffered from diarrhea, and it led to him being rushed to hospital.

Based on official and news sources, before their deaths, the children were being abused by Leavell-Keaton. It was alleged that on March 4, 2010, DeBlase permitted Leavell-Keaton to restrain four-year-old Natalie using tape, gag her, and lock her in a suitcase in a closet for an extended period; Natalie was also poisoned with antifreeze. Similarly, on June 20, 2010, Leavell-Keaton taped Chase's hands to his legs, strapped an object to his back, and gagged him. The boy, who was also poisoned with antifreeze, was reportedly forced to stand in a corner overnight while both Leavell-Keaton and DeBlase went to sleep. These instances led to the deaths of both Natalie and Chase under unspecified circumstances, and their bodies were later disposed of by the couple, who later moved from Alabama to Kentucky after the killing of Chase.

== Arrests of the couple ==
In November 2010, five months after the murder of Chase DeBlase, DeBlase was arrested for several charges of traffic violation offenses in Kentucky, and jailed overnight, and even had his van impounded. After his release, DeBlase and Leavell-Keaton got into an argument, and the latter's mother overheard the argument, and caught on the fact that something bad had happened to both Chase and Natalie. Leavell-Keaton's mother informed her fiancé about it and in turn, the fiancé sought advice from a friend who used to be a policeman.

Leavell-Keaton was brought in for questioning over the case, and she claimed that DeBlase had abused the children, whom she said were found unresponsive on March 4 and June 20, 2010, respectively, and their bodies were removed from the house. The children were therefore reported missing, although the police suspected that Leavell-Keaton was also involved in the case. The impounded van of DeBlase was searched by the police, and the police recovered pictures of Natalie and Chase, children's stuffed animals, a duffle bag, and a container of antifreeze. Further investigations led to the arrests of DeBlase and Leavell-Keaton for child abuse charges.

After his arrest, DeBlase confessed that both Chase and Natalie were already dead and that he was responsible for burying their bodies, but he claimed it was Leavell-Keaton who murdered the children. A month after the children were reported missing, the official search for the bodies of Natalie and Chase commenced on December 3, 2010. On December 11, 2010, the remains of Natalie were discovered in a forest near Citronelle, Alabama. Two days later, Chase's corpse was found in a heavily wooded area near Vancleave, Mississippi. An autopsy was conducted on the remains of both Natalie and Chase, but the cause of death could not be identified, although the pathologist confirmed that the deaths of the children were likely due to homicidal violence.

On December 8, 2010, 27-year-old John DeBlase was charged with abuse of a corpse and aggravated assault. Four days later, DeBlase was officially charged with two counts of felony murder and two counts of corpse abuse. DeBlase expressed through his lawyers that he pleaded not guilty on the grounds of diminished responsibility.

After she was extradited from Louisville, Kentucky to Mobile, Alabama, 22-year-old Heather Leavell-Keaton was originally charged with two counts each of aggravated child abuse and abuse of a corpse. On January 11, 2011, Leavell-Keaton's charges were upgraded to capital murder by Mobile County District Attorney John Tyson Jr., but Leavell-Keaton pleaded not guilty to the murder charges.

== Trials of the couple ==
=== John DeBlase ===
John Joseph DeBlase
- Born: 1983 (age 42–43); Alabama, U.S.
- Status: Incarcerated on death row in Alabama
- Conviction: Capital murder (×3)
- Penalty: Death by lethal injection

Details
- Victims: Natalie DeBlase, 4 Chase DeBlase, 3
- Date: March – June 2010
- Location: Alabama
- Imprisoned at: Holman Correctional Facility

Out of the two perpetrators, John DeBlase was the first to stand trial before a Mobile County jury for the murders of his children. The jury selection of DeBlase's trial commenced on October 14, 2014, the same date of his trial's first day. In fact, half of potential jurors had expressed in a survey in July 2013 (a year before the start of DeBlase's trial) that DeBlase was guilty of causing his children's deaths.

During the trial itself, the prosecution adduced confession letters penned by DeBlase, in which DeBlase admitted to killing his children, reportedly to put them out of their misery. He claimed that his wife and accomplice Leavell-Keaton had subjected both Chase and Natalie to torture and abuse. He claimed he had no alternative but to do this despite knowing that it was wrong to commit murder, for fear Leavell-Keaton could continue abusing the DeBlase siblings. Convicted murderer Brandon Jerell Newburn, a "jailhouse snitch" who was held in the same prison as DeBlase, testified that DeBlase wrote a total of ten letters and Newburn, who was serving two consecutive life sentences for a 2009 robbery-murder case, encouraged DeBlase to do so after the latter told him about the alleged abuse suffered by the children. In response to Newburn's testimony, the defence counsel of DeBlase argued that Newburn had helped their client to avoid being bullied and forced to lick toilets by two other inmates in the prison, and Newburn made use of this fact to make DeBlase write the letters, and therefore tried to raise doubts about his credibility as a witness.

On November 5, 2014, after a trial lasting ten days, the jury found DeBlase guilty of three counts of capital murder. The sentencing submissions were made on that same day, and the jury would decide between the sentence of death or life imprisonment without the possibility of parole.

During the submissions phase, the prosecution sought the death penalty for DeBlase, stating that such a grave sentence was warranted on account that the murders were "heinous, atrocious and cruel" and that there was more than one victim involved, and the deaths of both Chase and Natalie were "shockingly evil" and "extremely wicked". They also pointed out that in his defence, DeBlase insisted on pinning most of the blame on Heather Leavell-Keaton and claimed he was led along by Leavell-Keaton in killing his children. On the other hand, the defense stated that their client loved his children and was not as evil as what the prosecution painted him to be, and despite failing to protect his children, Leavell-Keaton's conduct were the main reasons that caused him to be involved in the murders. DeBlase's ex-wife, Corinne Heathcock, who was the biological mother of Natalie and Chase, stated that she felt guilty for her children and for giving up custody of the siblings, and she asked herself in court whether her children blamed or hated her for their plights.

On November 7, 2014, by a majority vote of 10–2, the jury recommended the death penalty for DeBlase. Originally, his sentencing hearing was set to begin on December 11, 2014, which was subsequently pushed back to January 8, 2015.

On January 8, 2015, 31-year-old John DeBlase was officially sentenced to death via lethal injection by Mobile County Circuit Court Judge Roderick P. "Rick" Stout. Reportedly, DeBlase addressed the court, stating that he would not ask for mercy, but asked for his life and proclaimed he never killed his children.

=== Heather Leavell-Keaton ===
Heather Leavell-Keaton
- Born: 1988 (age 37–38); Kentucky, U.S.
- Status: Incarcerated on death row in Alabama
- Convictions: Chase; Capital murder Natalie; Reckless manslaughter
- Penalty: Chase; Death by lethal injection – capital murder Natalie; 20 years' imprisonment – reckless manslaughter

Details
- Victims: Natalie DeBlase, 4 Chase DeBlase, 3
- Date: March – June 2010
- Location: Alabama
- Imprisoned at: Julia Tutwiler Prison for Women

Heather Leavell-Keaton was the second person to stand trial for the murders of the DeBlase siblings. On May 8, 2015, Leavell-Keaton's trial began before a jury at the Mobile County Circuit Court, although she tried unsuccessfully to move her trial venue from Mobile County to another location.

On May 27, 2015, the jury returned with their verdict, finding Leavell-Keaton guilty of capital murder for the death of Chase, but of reckless manslaughter in the killing of Natalie. The verdict was reportedly described as "bizarre" by the prosecution, given that the jury found that Leavell-Keaton had intentionally intended to kill Chase but yet found that the death of Natalie did not happen intentionally due to Leavell-Keaton's actions.

The sentencing trial of Leavell-Keaton commenced a day after her conviction. John DeBlase, who was then incarcerated at the Holman Correctional Facility, was brought to court as a witness in the hearing, but he chose to not testify. Heather Rios, an old friend of Keaton and DeBlase, told jurors that Chase, who often played together with Rios's children, was a sweet boy who would "giggle about anything and everything" and she recounted the "multiple emotional breakdowns" she suffered once the trials began, and revealed that her own children were also unable to comprehend why a child had to suffer from such violent treatment as observed from the DeBlase children's deaths.

For a total of three hours into the hearing, defense witness Catherine Boyer, a psychologist, testified that Leavell-Keaton showed signs of depression and bipolar disorder when she was 14, and brought up a 2009 psychiatric report, in which Leavell-Keaton was possibly suffering from both borderline personality disorder and post-traumatic stress disorder, the latter due to a case of sexual abuse when Leavell-Keaton was 11, but she later admitted during the prosecution's cross-examination that this was not an actual diagnosis. Boyer also opined that Leavell-Keaton had "very deficient" social skills. The forensic pathologist and scientists were also called to the stand to testify on the post-mortem examinations and results of their findings in the deaths of the DeBlase children.

On June 2, 2015, with a majority vote of 11–1, the jury recommended that Leavell-Keaton should be sentenced to death for the capital murder charge over Chase's death, in addition to 20 years' imprisonment for the manslaughter of Natalie.

On August 20, 2015, Mobile County Circuit Court Judge Rick Stout sentenced 27-year-old Heather Leavell-Keaton to death by lethal injection for the murder of Chase DeBlase, plus 20 years' jail for the manslaughter of Natalie DeBlase. Leavell-Keaton was the first woman to be given the death penalty in Mobile County, and reportedly, Mobile District Attorney Ashley Rich stated that Leavell-Keaton deserved the death penalty, and described her as a "domineering, manipulative, deceitful and morally unhinged woman".

== Appeal process ==
=== DeBlase's appeals ===
On November 16, 2018, the Alabama Court of Criminal Appeals rejected John DeBlase's appeal against his death sentence and capital murder convictions.

On August 24, 2019, DeBlase's follow-up appeal to the Alabama Supreme Court was also dismissed.

=== Leavell-Keaton's appeals ===
On October 7, 2020, the Alabama Court of Criminal Appeals allowed the appeal of Leavell-Keaton and overturned her death sentence. The same court ordered a re-sentencing trial, because the court ruled that Leavell-Keaton did not have a chance during her original trial to make a statement before the verdict on sentence was delivered, and hence, her case was remitted to the Mobile County Circuit Court for re-sentencing.

The first re-sentencing hearing of Leavell-Keaton was scheduled on November 17, 2020. On January 7, 2021, the original trial judge, Mobile County Circuit Judge Rick Stout (who retired at this point), reinstated the death sentence of Leavell-Keaton. Prior to her sentencing, Leavell-Keaton pleaded to the court to spare her life as she devoted herself to religion and was no longer a danger to anyone, but the statement failed to move the judge, who re-sentenced Leavell-Keaton to death.

On December 17, 2021, the Alabama Court of Criminal Appeals upheld Leavell-Keaton's death sentence and capital murder conviction and thus turned down her appeal. Her subsequent appeal to the Alabama Supreme Court was also rejected in 2022.

On June 5, 2023, the U.S. Supreme Court dismissed Leavell-Keaton's final appeal, thereby confirming her death sentence for the DeBlase children murders.

== Current status ==
As of 2025, John DeBlase is incarcerated on death row at the Holman Correctional Facility while Heather Leavell-Keaton is held on death row at the Julia Tutwiler Prison for Women. Leavell-Keaton is one of five women to be held on Alabama's death row.

== See also ==
- Capital punishment in Alabama
- List of death row inmates in the United States § Alabama
- List of women on death row in the United States § Alabama
