= Julia Tutwiler Prison for Women =

Prison in Wetumpka, Alabama, United States

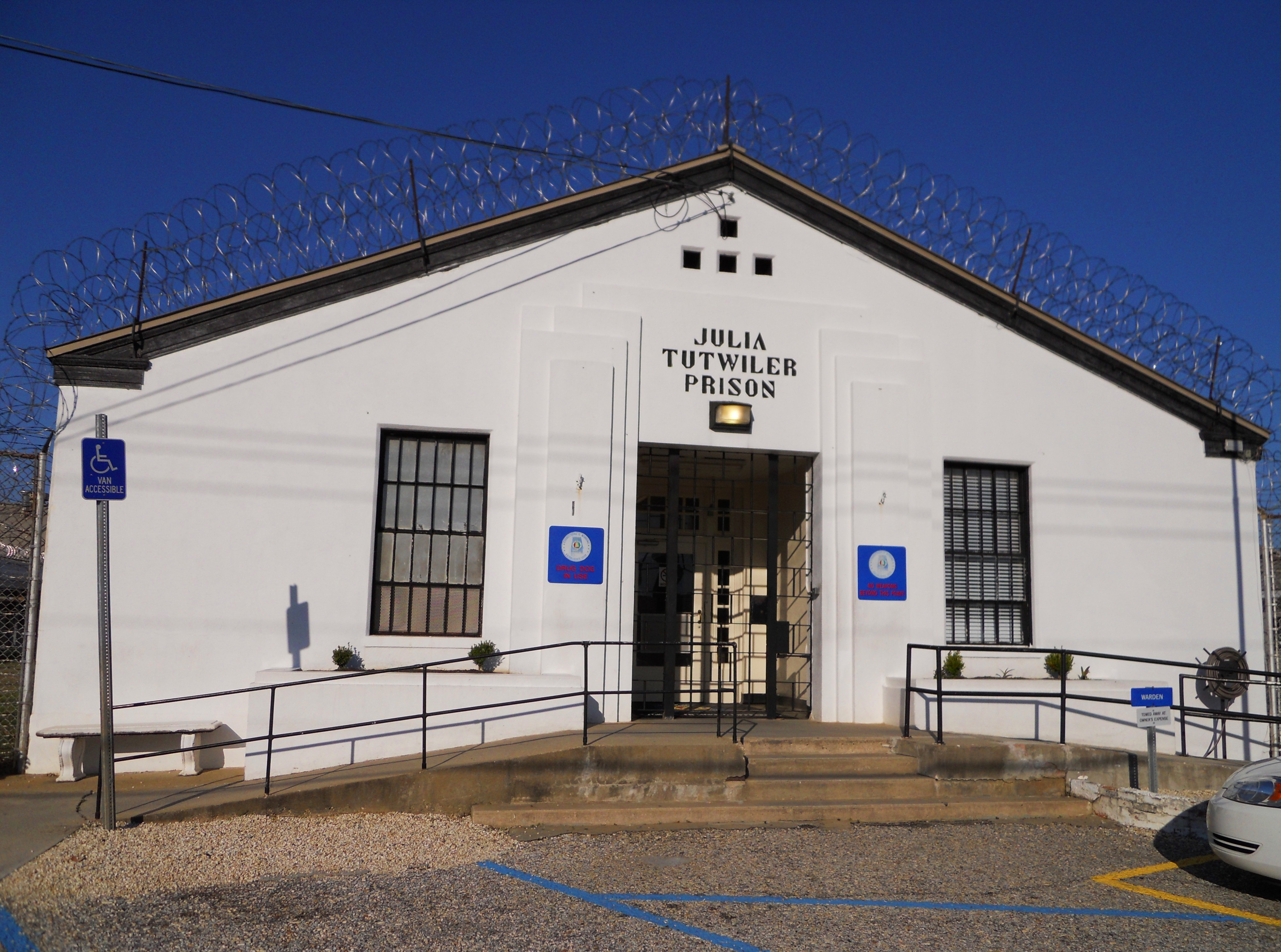
- The front entrance of Julia Tutwiler Prison is located along U.S. Highway 231 in Wetumpka, Alabama.
- Interactive map of Julia Tutwiler Prison for Women
- Location: Wetumpka, Alabama; 32°33′50″N 86°11′37″W
- Status: Operational
- Security class: Maximum
- Capacity: 702
- Population: 1200 (2017)
- Opened: December 1942
- Former name: Wetumpka State Penitentiary
- Managed by: Alabama Department of Corrections
- Warden: Deidra Wright

The Julia Tutwiler Prison for Women is a facility of the Alabama Department of Corrections (ADOC), located in Wetumpka, Alabama named after prison reform activist Julia Tutwiler. All female inmates entering ADOC are sent to the receiving unit in Tutwiler. Tutwiler houses Alabama's female death row, which qualifies it for the "maximum security" classification.

== Julia S. Tutwiler on prison reform ==
Known as the "angel of the prisons", Tutwiler pushed for many reforms of the Alabama penal system. In a letter sent from Julia Tutwiler in Dothan, Alabama to Frank S. White in Birmingham, Alabama, Tutwiler pushed for key issues such as the end to convict leasing, the re-establishment of night school education, and the separation of minor offenders and hardened criminals. Tutwiler's letter cites major controversies during her time such as the Banner Mining Incident of 1911, where 125 of the 128 dead miners were convicts, predominately guilty of minor offenses, leased by state prisons.

Tutwiler additionally suggested medical and psychological treatment for convicts such as rehabilitation for drug addicts, sanitation, and nurses to care for dying inmates who lack families to visit them. Despite her progressive stance on prison reform, Tutwiler also pandered to a segregationist approach to the prison system, advocating the separation of prison inmates by race as it is "important for public welfare to separate them in all other relations- in schools, in travel, and in social life, it would be better for both races if this could be done here also."

== History ==
Construction on the current Tutwiler Prison was completed in December 1942. The prison, built for $350,000, originally held up to 400 female prisoners. The current Tutwiler replaced the previous Wetumpka State Penitentiary, which was the first state prison.

The Julia Tutwiler Prison for Women housed 992 inmates in 2003, when U.S. District Judge Myron Herbert Thompson found that its overcrowded, underfunded conditions were so poor that they violated the U.S. Constitution.

In 2012, the Equal Justice Initiative (EJI), a nonprofit that provides legal representation to indigent defendants and prisoners, filed a formal complaint with the U.S. Department of Justice saying that "[i]n interviews with more than 50 women...EJI uncovered evidence of frequent and severe officer-on-inmate sexual violence."

In May 2013, Tutwiler ranked as one of the ten worst prisons in the United States, based on reporting in Mother Jones magazine.

== Facility ==
Tutwiler has room for about 700 prisoners. The death row has room for four prisoners. The prison has a clothing factory.

Privacy curtains were installed in showers and toilets of one dormitory in 2014.

One dormitory has walls painted pink in order to soothe prisoners.

== Results of investigation ==
On January 17, 2014, the U.S. Department of Justice released a report of their findings of their investigation into the allegations of ongoing sexual abuse of inmates by prison guards. "We find that the State of Alabama violates the Eighth Amendment of the United States Constitution by failing to protect women prisoners at Tutwiler from harm due to sexual abuse and harassment from correctional staff.

"Tutwiler has a history of unabated staff-on-prisoner sexual abuse and harassment. The women at Tutwiler universally fear for their safety. They live in a sexualized environment with repeated and open sexual behavior, including: abusive sexual contact between staff and prisoners; sexualized activity, including a strip show condoned by staff; profane and unprofessional sexualized language and harassment; and deliberate cross-gender viewing of prisoners showering, urinating and defecating.

[...]

"Officials at the Alabama Department of Corrections ("ADOC") and Tutwiler have failed to remedy the myriad systemic causes of harm to the women prisoners at Tutwiler despite repeated notification of the problems. ADOC and Tutwiler have demonstrated a clear deliberate indifference to the harm and substantial risk of harm to women prisoners. They have failed to take reasonable steps to protect people in their custody from the known and readily apparent threat of sexual abuse and sexual harassment. Officials have been on notice for over eighteen years of the risks to women prisoners and, for over eighteen years, have chosen to ignore them.

[...]

"We have made the following factual determinations:

"For nearly two decades, Tutwiler staff have harmed women in their care with impunity by sexually abusing and sexually harassing them. Staff have raped, sodomized, fondled, and exposed themselves to prisoners. They have coerced prisoners to engage in oral sex. Staff engage in voyeurism, forcing women to disrobe and watching them while they use the shower and use the toilet...

[...]

"Prison officials have failed to curb the sexual abuse and sexual harassment despite possessing actual knowledge of the harm, including a federal statistical analysis identifying sexual misconduct at Tutwiler as occurring at one of the highest rates in the country."

On February 2, 2016, Alabama Governor Robert J. Bentley announced in his State of the State speech that Tutwiler prison would be closed as a part of a "complete transformation of the prison system," which would include the construction of new facilities. "The process" was due to start within the 2016 calendar year but, as of 2020, the prison remains open.

== Notable inmates ==
- Lynda Lyon Block - Alabama Institutional Serial #Z575 - Executed on May 10, 2002
- Amy Bishop - University of Alabama in Huntsville (UAH) professor who perpetrated a mass shooting there; sentenced to life without parole. As of 2020, her security classification is medium and her residence is a dormitory instead of a cell block.
- Judith Neelley - convicted kidnapper and murderer.
- Betty Woods Wilson - convicted in the murder of her husband and sentenced to life imprisonment. Case featured on Forensic Files (Court TV). She married Bill Campbell in the prison in 2016.

=== Inmates on Death Row ===
- Patricia Blackmon - convicted in the murder of her 2-year-old stepdaughter, Dominiqua Bryant.
- Tierra Capri Gobble - convicted in the murder of her 4-month-old son, Phoenix Cody Parrish.
- Lisa Leanne Graham - convicted in capital murder of her daughter by a family friend.
- Heather Leavell-Keaton - convicted in the murder of the children of her common-law husband, 4-year-old Natalie DeBlase and 3-year-old Chase DeBlase.
- Christie Michelle Scott - convicted in the murder of her 6-year-old son, Mason Scott.

== See also ==
- Capital punishment in Alabama
