= Banner Mine disaster =

1911 coal mine explosion in Alabama, United States

Coordinates: 33°41′19″N 86°59′54″W

The Banner mine disaster of April 8, 1911 near Littleton, Alabama was a coal mine explosion that killed 128 people. The event ranks among the 15 deadliest coal mine disasters in U.S. history.

The exact cause of the early-morning blast is unknown. It is likely that an accidental spark ignited gas in the air, which directly killed seven men and knocked out a ventilation fan. Without the fan, levels of blackdamp rose in the mine. Another 121 miners suffocated. About 40 other workers were able to dig their way through rubble and escape.

The Banner Mine was run by Pratt Consolidated Coal Company, then owned by Tennessee Coal & Iron. Seventy-two of the casualties were black convicts leased from the state and from Jefferson County. The explosion brought enough attention to horrific mine conditions for new governor Emmet O'Neal to push a mine safety bill through the legislature.
