= William E. Donaldson Correctional Facility =

Alabama Department of Corrections prison

Coordinates: 33°30′50.17″N 87°11′5.23″W

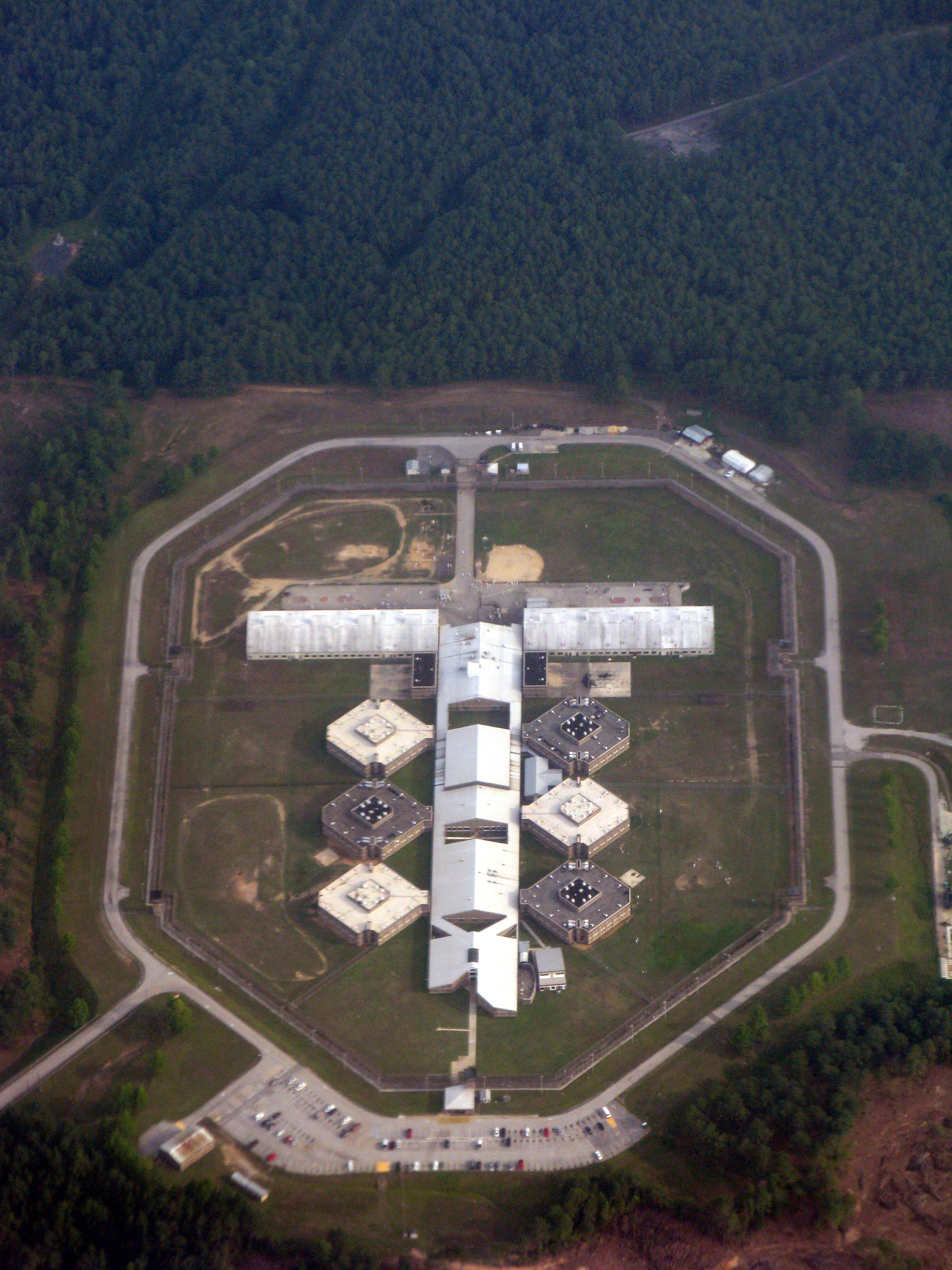
- Interactive map of William E. Donaldson; Correctional Facility
- Location: Jefferson County, Alabama
- Status: Open
- Security class: Maximum
- Capacity: 1492
- Opened: 1982
- Managed by: Alabama Department of Corrections

William E. Donaldson Correctional Facility is an Alabama Department of Corrections prison for men located in unincorporated Jefferson County, Alabama, near Bessemer. It came to national prominence after the Casey White prison escape in 2022.

== History ==
The prison opened as the West Jefferson Correctional Facility in 1982. On January 12, 1990, corrections officer William E. Donaldson was stabbed and killed by an inmate. The prison was later renamed in honor of officer Donaldson. Originally the prison had a capacity for 700 inmates in dormitory housing and 16 inmates in individual prison cells; the capacity increased as expansions opened.

In 1996, according to Joe Hopper, the commissioner of the Alabama Department of Corrections, the system's prison guard shortage was the most acute at Donaldson during that year. In that year the prison housed around 1,400 prisoners, with 207 prison guards watching them.

Donaldson was the main setting of the documentary film The Dhamma Brothers, which chronicles the establishment of a Vipassana meditation program for prisoners.

== Operations ==
As of 2010 the facility can house 1,492 prisoners. The Alabama Department of Corrections classifies Donaldson as a maximum security prison. The agency uses Donaldson to house inmates who have multiple or repeated violent offenses and who ADOC cannot easily manage. Hundreds of offenders who are housed at Donaldson have life without parole sentences. The prison includes a segregation unit for 300 inmates; Donaldson's segregation unit is the largest unit in the State of Alabama.

The correctional facility came under media scrutiny in 2022 after 7 inmates died within the span of one week.

== Notable inmates ==
- Thomas Edwin Blanton Jr. - One of the perpetrators of the 16th Street Baptist Church bombing; died in 2020.
- Coley McCraney - Murdered two teen girls in 1999. Sentenced to life without parole.
- Mason Sisk - Sentenced to life in prison for killing his adoptive parents and three younger siblings on September 2, 2019, in Elkmont, Alabama.
- Moneek Marcell Ackles (a.k.a Marcel Ackles), sentenced to life without parole for the 1993 murder of Gregory Huguley.

== See also ==
- Capital punishment in Alabama
