= Alabama Department of Corrections =

Government agency in Alabama, United States

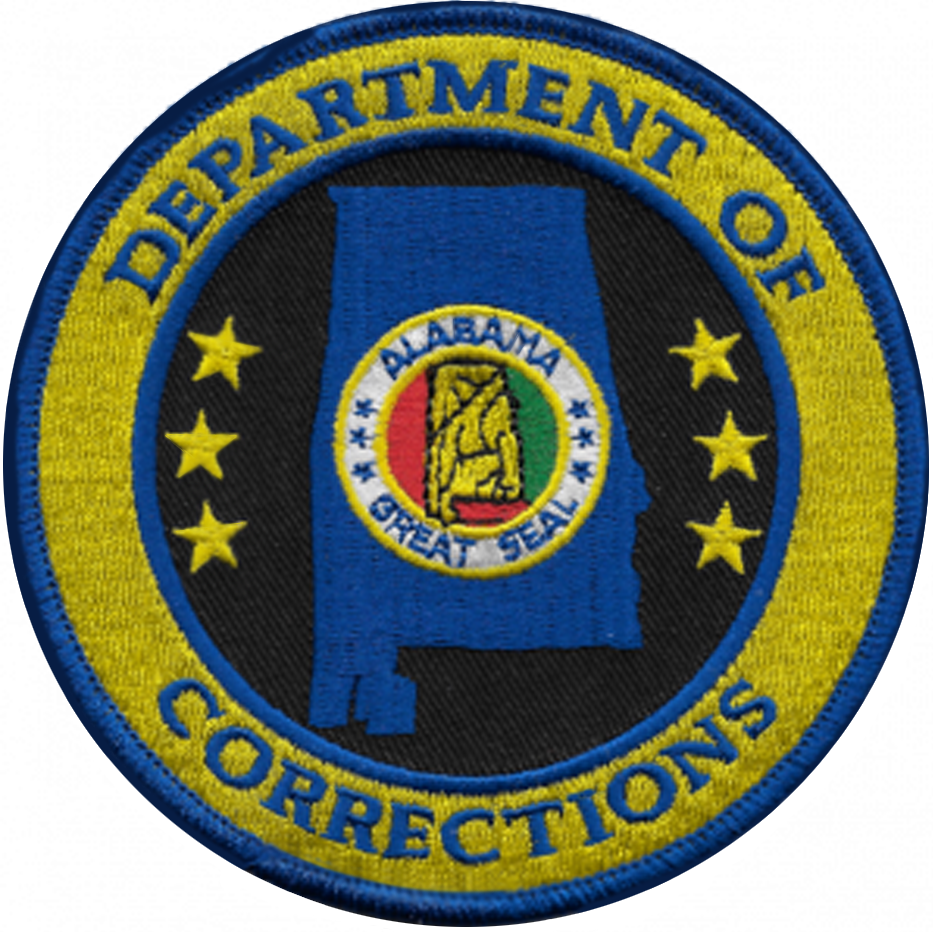
- Patch

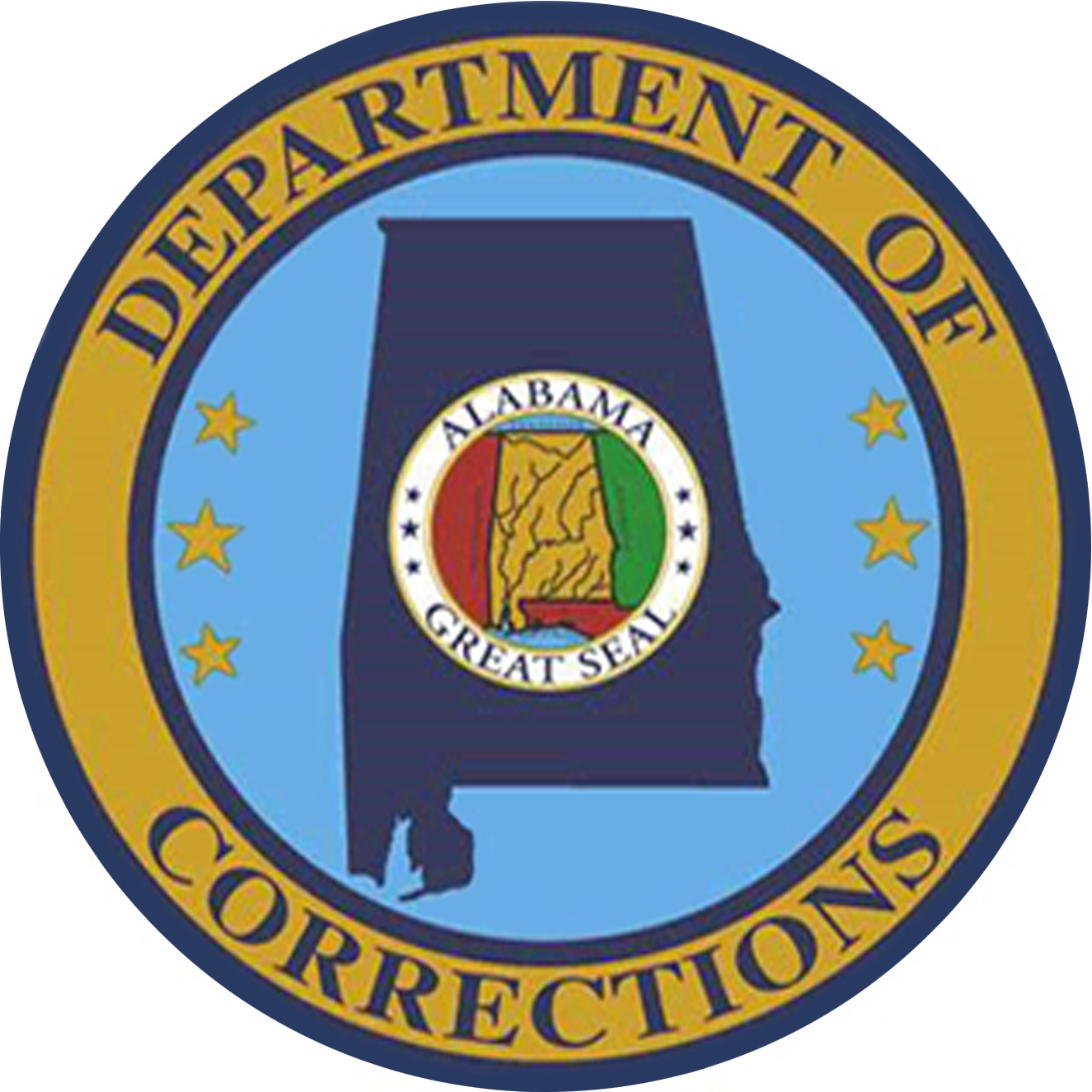
- Seal
- Abbreviation: ADOC
- Motto: Professionalism, Integrity, Accountability

Agency overview
- Formed: February 3, 1983; (43 years ago)

Jurisdictional structure
- Operations jurisdiction: Alabama, US
- Map of Alabama Department of Corrections's jurisdiction
- Area: 52,419 square miles (135,760 km^{2})
- Population: 4,887,871 (2,018)
- General nature: Civilian police

Operational structure
- Headquarters: Montgomery, Alabama
- Elected officer responsible: Kay Ivey, Governor of Alabama
- Agency executives: John Q. Hamm, Commissioner; Anne Hill, Chief of Staff
- Parent agency: State of Alabama

Facilities
- Major facilities Work releases: 15 18

Website
- ADOC Website

The Alabama Department of Corrections (ADOC) is the agency responsible for incarceration of convicted felons in the state of Alabama in the United States. It is headquartered in the Alabama Criminal Justice Center in Montgomery.

Alabama has relatively long mandatory sentencing laws compared to most other states, resulting in a rising prison population stemming from longer prison sentences. It operates the nation's most crowded prison system. In 2015 it housed more than 24,000 inmates in a system designed for 13,318. In 2015 it settled a class-action suit over physical and sexual violence against inmates at the Julia Tutwiler Prison for Women in Wetumpka. The department also spends the least of any state on a per-prisoner basis.

As of 2018, Alabama has the 6th highest incarceration rate under state prison or local jail jurisdiction per 100,000 population in the U.S.

== History ==
=== Early prison system and convict leasing ===
The Alabama Department of Corrections was established in 1983 as the latest in a series of state agencies responsible for Alabama's prison system dating to the creation of the Board of Inspectors of the Penitentiary in 1841. Alabama's first state-operated prison, the Wetumpka State Penitentiary, opened that year. Before the end of the Civil War, the penitentiary's population was approximately 99 percent white and one percent free Black. Enslaved Black people were generally punished for alleged offenses by their enslavers rather than through the state prison system. Following the abolition of slavery in 1865, the prison population shifted to approximately 90 percent Black and 10 percent white.

An 1846 law permitted the state to lease inmates and the Wetumpka penitentiary to private operators in order to finance the institution. After the Civil War, Governor Robert M. Patton authorized the leasing of prisoner labor for Reconstruction projects, particularly the rebuilding of railroads. After the railroads were rebuilt, prisoners were used by farms, lumberyards, and coal and iron mines. In 1875, amid a state fiscal crisis, Alabama began charging contractors monthly payments for individual prisoners, making convict leasing a source of state revenue; county governments subsequently developed similar systems.

In 1883, the state legislature approved a system under which most state prisoners were leased to the Pratt Coal and Iron Company, the Tennessee Coal, Iron and Railroad Company, and the Sloss Iron and Steel Company. The companies built and operated prisons at their mining sites. More than 90 percent of state prisoners and 95 percent of county prisoners in the system were African American. The National Park Service notes that some historians have characterized post-Civil War convict leasing as a form of "second slavery", while others have interpreted it as part of the broader system of Jim Crow or of wider changes in American crime and punishment.

Conditions in the prison mines were frequently dangerous and deadly. In the 1911 Banner Mine disaster, 128 miners were killed, 125 of whom were prisoners leased to the mining company. In 1912, the Tennessee Coal, Iron and Railroad Company stopped using convict labor, after which the state itself operated prison mines and sold the coal produced by prisoners. Legislation passed in 1927 prohibited both the leasing of state or county prisoners and their employment in coal mines after June 30, 1928. Alabama was the last state in the United States to abolish the convict-lease system.

=== Road labor, prison farms, and work release ===
The abolition of convict leasing did not end prison labor in Alabama. The same body of state law that prohibited leasing authorized state and county prisoners to be used on public roads, bridges, and other public works. The State Highway Department was authorized to use prisoners in constructing and maintaining roads and bridges, while the Board of Administration could employ prisoners on state-owned land for farming and other work. Road camps subsequently formed a substantial part of the state prison system. In 1972, a federal district court described Alabama's system as consisting of five major prisons, a minimum-security facility, an honor farm, a pre-release center, and 13 road camps.

Alabama enacted a state work release program in 1972 and placed it under the jurisdiction of the Board of Corrections. By 1976, a federal court reported that the system operated eight work-release centers and one pre-release center alongside six remaining road camps. The court described work release as allowing a limited number of selected prisoners to work, develop job skills, gradually reenter the community, and save a portion of their wages before release. It also noted that prisoners performing institutional work generally received no pay and that prisoners at Fountain and Holman were routinely assigned to farm labor.

During the 1970s, Alabama prisons were ordered to undertake major reforms by a federal judge who described some conditions as "barbaric." Among other things, the judge ordered the closing of "dog houses," the name for hot, dark and filthy cells used to punish prisoners.

In 2007, the prison system ended its farming programs.

In 2016, Governor Robert Bentley proposed $800 million in state bonds to build four large prisons, each with a designed capacity of 3,500 prisoners. This program would allow the state to close an unspecified number of older facilities. Press reports indicate the troubled Julia Tutwiler Prison for Women would be the first to be replaced; a federal class-action suit was settled in 2015 over abuse of women at that facility.

In October 2016, the US Department of Justice announced that it was conducting a review and investigation of Alabama's men's prisons to evaluate conditions as the Constitution promises humane treatment. "The investigation will focus on whether prisoners are adequately protected from physical harm and sexual abuse at the hands of other prisoners; whether prisoners are adequately protected from use of excessive force and staff sexual abuse by correctional officers; and whether the prisons provide sanitary, secure and safe living conditions."

In his February 2017 State of the State address, Governor Bentley talked in more detail about his proposed three-faceted approach to overhaul the Department of Corrections: "One, close Julia Tutwiler Prison for Women and build a new 1,200 bed women’s facility; Two, consolidate 13 of 15 close- and medium-security men’s facilities into three, new, 4,000-bed, state-of-the-art prisons and; Three, repurpose and renovate the remaining antiquated, facilities into Rehabilitation and Re-entry Centers focused on preparing inmates for release back into the community."

In June 2017 a federal court pointed out the Department provided inadequate mental health case, suicide prevention, psychotherapy, programming, out-of-cell time as well as monitoring of suicidal inmates.

In 2019 the U.S. Department of Justice found conditions in Alabama prisons to be unsafe and unconstitutional, as result of a long civil rights investigation prompted by numerous deaths from violence in Alabama lockups. Prisoners routinely face prisoner-on-prisoner violence and sexual abuse, unprotected by the State. The DOJ notes "a high level of violence that is too common, cruel, of an unusual nature, and pervasive." The detailed report outlines cases of inmate deaths, rapes, extortion of prisoners' families and rampant contraband weapons and drugs. It says facilities violate the constitution, by not providing "adequate humane conditions of confinement".

By the end of 2019, the legislature had not yet funded Governor Bentley's plan for new facilities. The state announced that most of the Holman prison would be closed.

In October 2021, Governor Kay Ivey signed a prison construction package into law. The $1.3 billion package includes three prison construction bills and one prison reform bill. Among them, House Bill 5 allocates $400 million of federal COVID relief funds towards the construction of two new 4,000 bed facilities. House Bill 2, a sentencing reform bill, requires "inmates to spend a period at the end of their prison sentences on release under supervision by the Alabama Bureau of Pardons and Paroles instead of staying in prison until the last day." The construction cost of one facility, a 4,000-bed men's prison in Elmore County, increased by 56 percent to over $1 billion in 2023.

In January 2024, a lawsuit was filed after prisoners who’d died while in Alabama DOC custody were returned with vital organs missing. This follows several reported incidents of prisoners being found dead in Alabama prisons being returned missing such organs.

In December 2024, an Associated Press investigation described Alabama's contemporary prison labor system as part of a history of commercialized prison labor extending back more than 150 years, including the post-Civil War convict-leasing system. An analysis of Alabama Department of Corrections records found that more than 10,000 prisoners had performed approximately 17 million hours of work outside prison facilities since 2018, including work for public agencies and private businesses. At least 500 private businesses employed prisoners between 2018 and March 2024. The AP calculated that the state had received more than $250 million since 2000 through contracts and deductions from prisoners' wages; at the time of the investigation, the department deducted 40 percent of wages earned through work release in addition to certain fees. The department characterized work release as voluntary and as an important part of preparation for reentry.

== Operations ==
All female inmates are sent to the receiving unit in the Julia Tutwiler Prison for Women.

== Facilities ==
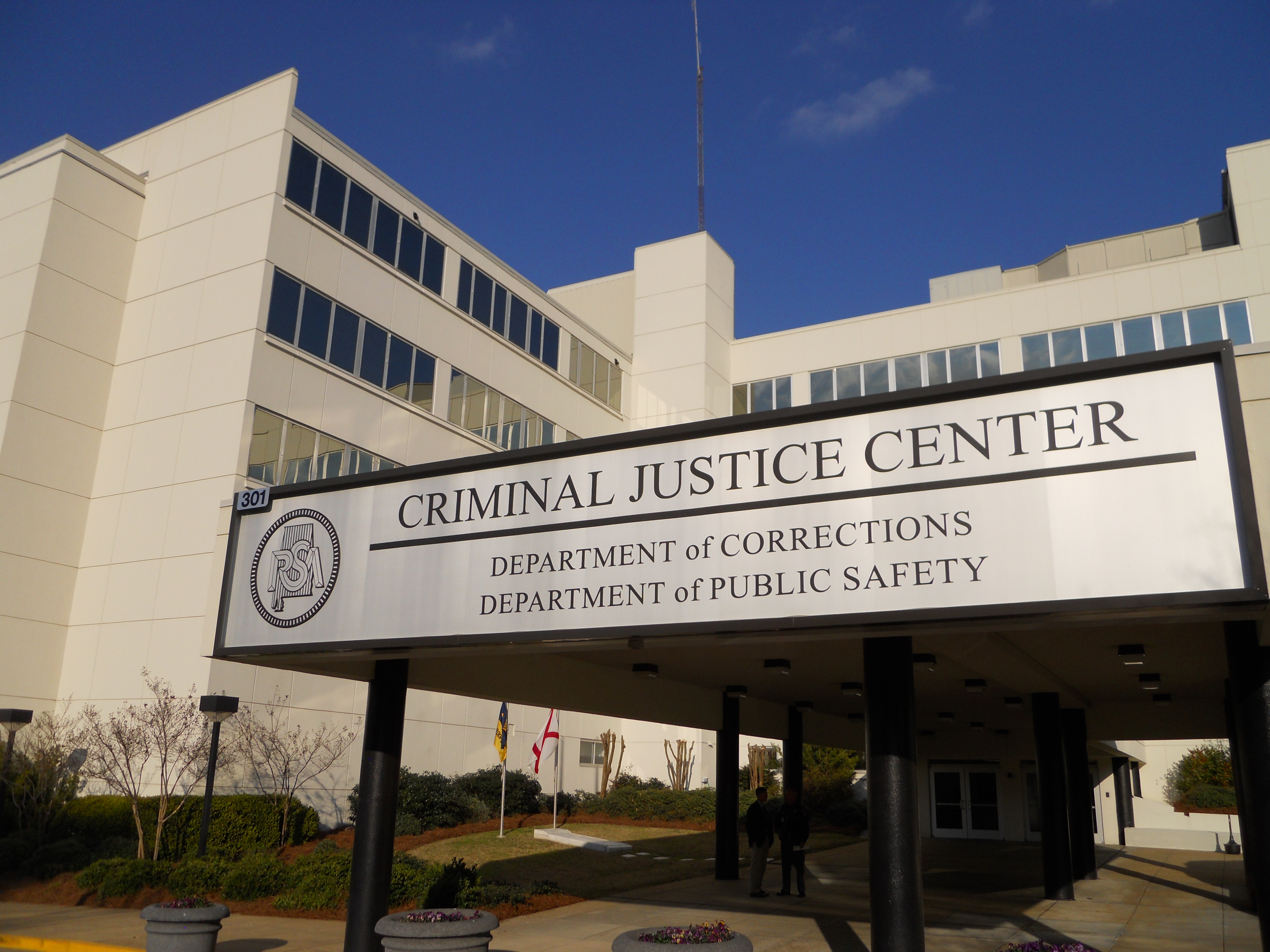
- The Alabama Criminal Justice Center houses the headquarters of the Department of Corrections and the Department of Public Safety
  List of Alabama state prisons

== Death row ==
Unlike other states, Alabama has no provision to provide counsel to prisoners on Death Row. Prisoners' rights groups such as the Equal Justice Initiative based in Montgomery, Alabama, have worked to fill the need. They have gained the exoneration of numerous innocent men on death row and prevented the deaths of others whose cases were considered worthy of resentencing.

The US Supreme Court has ruled that persons convicted of crimes committed as children cannot be sentenced to death. In addition, it has ruled that persons convicted of crimes committed as children cannot be sentenced to life in prison without parole (LWOP), saying that both kinds of sentences are unconstitutional. It has directed that its ruling on LWOP is to be applied retroactively and states must undertake reviews of prisoners who were sentenced to LWOP for crimes committed as children.

Holman Correctional Facility is the site where all executions authorized by the state are conducted. Its male death row originally had a capacity of 20. In the summer of 2000, capacity was increased to 200 single cells.

The William E. Donaldson Correctional Facility has a male death row with a capacity of 24. Donaldson's death row houses prisoners who need to stay in the Birmingham judicial district. Julia Tutwiler Prison for Women holds the female death row.

In February 2018, the Alabama Department of Corrections was responsible for carrying out the botched attempted execution of Doyle Hamm. During the execution attempt, executioners attempted for nearly three hours to insert an IV that could be used to administer the lethal injection drugs. In the process, the execution team punctured Hamm's bladder and femoral artery, causing significant bleeding.

== Fallen officers ==
Since the establishment of the Alabama Department of Corrections, eleven officers and three K-9 have died while on duty.

== Gallery ==
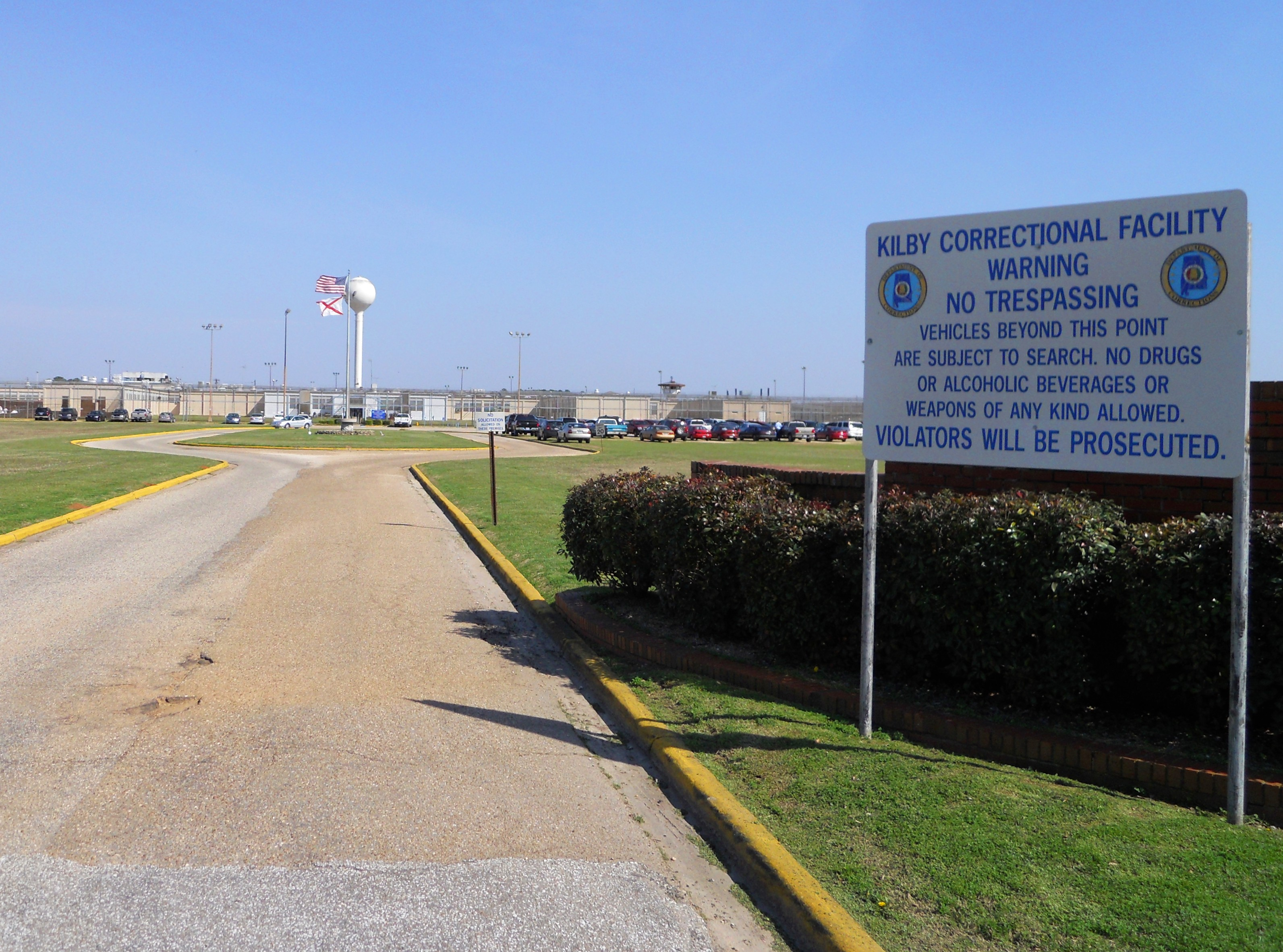
Kilby Correctional Facility

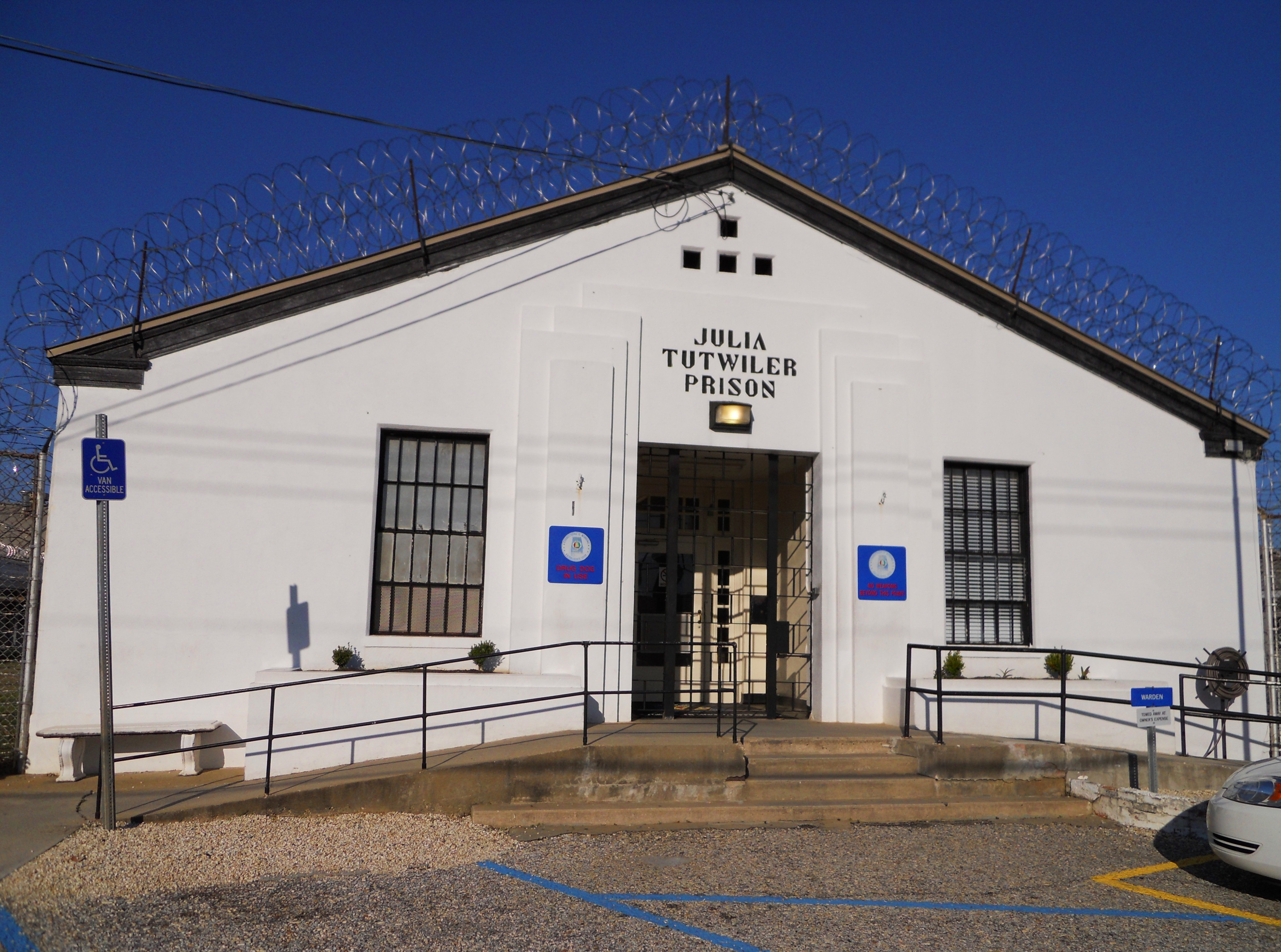
Julia Tutwiler Prison for Women

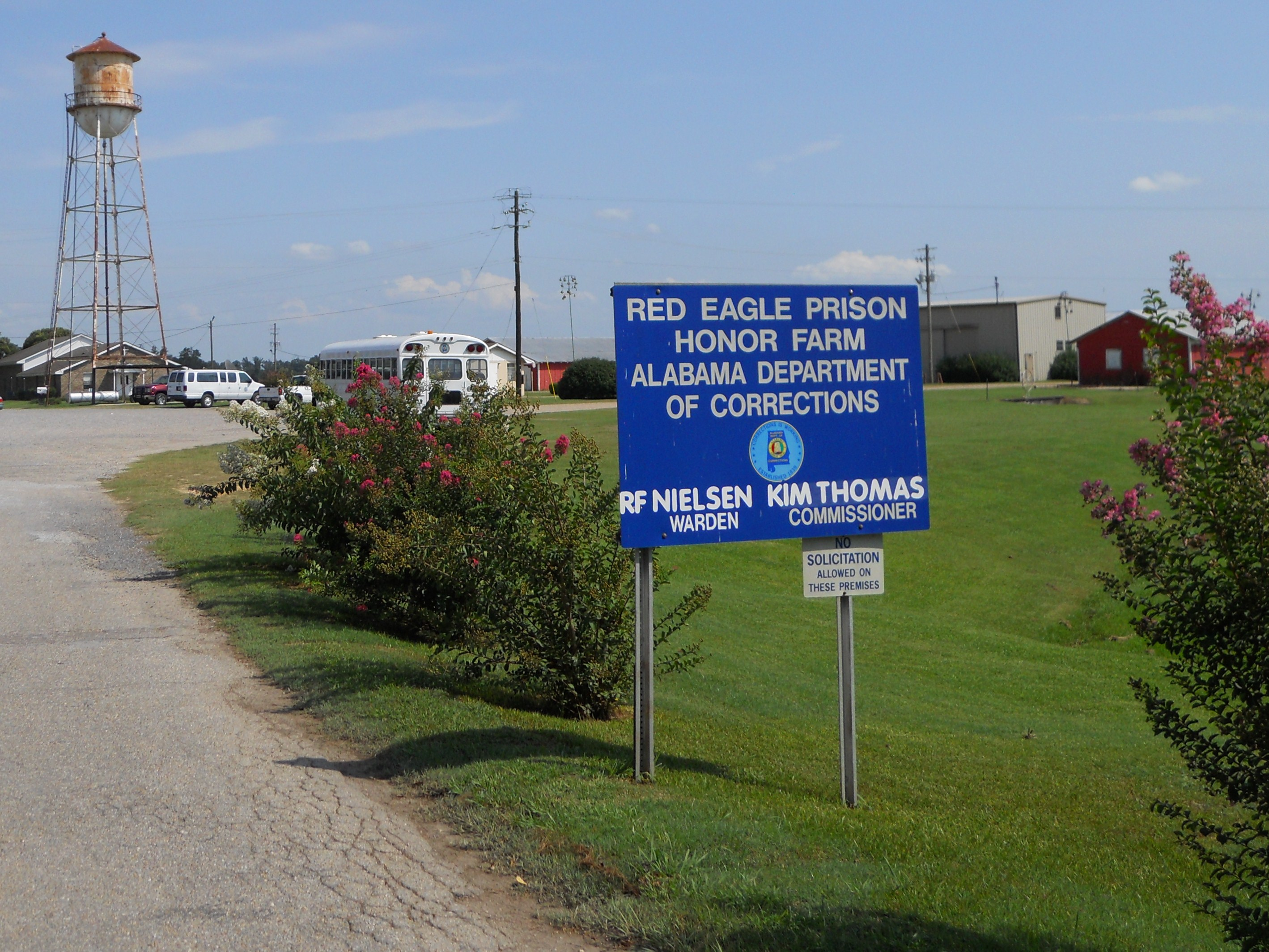
Red Eagle Work Center

== See also ==
- List of law enforcement agencies in Alabama
- List of United States state correction agencies
- List of United States state prisons
- Prison
- List of U.S. states and territories by incarceration and correctional supervision rate
