= 2015 New Orleans Saints season =

NFL team season

- Owner: Tom Benson
- General manager: Mickey Loomis
- Head coach: Sean Payton
- Offensive coordinator: Pete Carmichael Jr.
- Defensive coordinator: Rob Ryan (Weeks 1–10, fired); Dennis Allen (Weeks 11–17)
- Home stadium: Mercedes-Benz Superdome

Results
- Record: 7–9
- Division place: 3rd NFC South
- Playoffs: Did not qualify
- Pro Bowlers: Cameron Jordan (DE)

Uniform
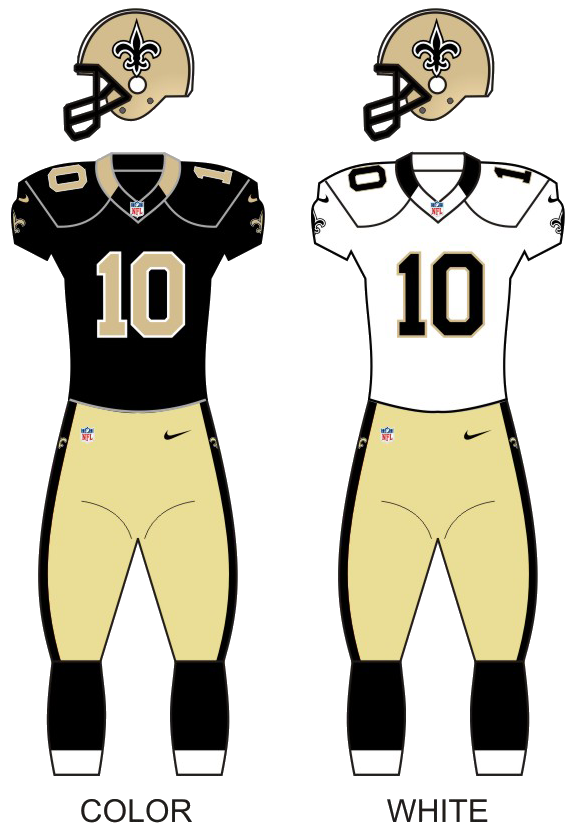

The 2015 season was the New Orleans Saints' 49th in the National Football League (NFL), their 40th playing home games at the Mercedes-Benz Superdome and their ninth under head coach Sean Payton. On November 16, 2015, the Saints hired Dennis Allen to replace fired defensive coordinator Rob Ryan and address their consistently poor defensive play. However, the Saints still missed the playoffs for the second consecutive season. The Saints set a new league record for the most passing touchdowns allowed with 45.

== Draft ==
2015 New Orleans Saints Draft
Round	Selection	Player	Position	College
1	13	Andrus Peat	OT	Stanford
1	31	Stephone Anthony	ILB	Clemson
2	44	Hau'oli Kikaha	OLB	Washington
3	75	Garrett Grayson	QB	Colorado State
3	78	P. J. Williams	CB	Florida State
5	148	Davis Tull	OLB	Chattanooga
5	154	Tyeler Davison	DT	Fresno State
5	167	Damian Swann	CB	Georgia
7	230	Marcus Murphy	RB	Missouri

Notes

- The Saints acquired an additional first-round selection (No. 31 overall) and center Max Unger as part of a trade that sent their fourth-round selection (No. 109 overall) and tight end Jimmy Graham to the Seattle Seahawks.
- The Saints acquired an additional third-round selection (No. 78 overall) and linebacker Dannell Ellerbe as part of a trade that sent wide receiver Kenny Stills to the Miami Dolphins.
- The Saints acquired an additional fifth-round selection (No. 154 overall) as part of a trade that sent guard Ben Grubbs to the Kansas City Chiefs.
- The Saints acquired an additional fifth-round selection (No. 167 overall) as part of a trade that sent their sixth-round selection (No. 187 overall) and 2016 sixth-round selection to the Washington Redskins.

== Staff ==
2015 New Orleans Saints staff
Front office: Owner – Tom Benson; President – Dennis Lauscha; General manager – Mickey Loomis; Director of football administration – Khai Harley; Director of operations – James Nagaoka; Director of pro scouting – Terry Fontenot; Head coaches: Head coach – Sean Payton; Offensive coaches: Offensive coordinator – Pete Carmichael; Quarterbacks – Mike Neu; Running backs – Joel Thomas; Wide receivers – John Morton; Tight ends – Dan Roushar; Offensive line – Bret Ingalls; Offensive assistant – Kyle DeVan; Offensive assistant – Greg Lewis; Offensive assistant – Brendan Nugent	Defensive coaches: Defensive coordinator – Dennis Allen; Defensive line – Bill Johnson; Inside linebackers – Joe Vitt; Outside linebackers – Brian Young; Secondary – Wesley McGriff; Defensive assistant – Marcus Ungaro; Defensive assistant – James Willis; Special teams coaches: Special teams coordinator – Greg McMahon; Assistant special teams – Stan Kwan

== Final roster ==
2015 New Orleans Saints roster
Quarterbacks (QB): 9 Drew Brees; 18 Garrett Grayson; 3 Matt Flynn; Running backs (RB): 38 Travaris Cadet; 34 Tim Hightower; 35 Austin Johnson FB; 45 Toben Opurum FB; Wide receivers (WR): 16 Brandon Coleman; 12 Marques Colston; 10 Brandin Cooks; 15 Seantavius Jones; 83 Willie Snead; Tight ends (TE): 88 RaShaun Allen; 89 Josh Hill; 84 Michael Hoomanawanui; 82 Ben Watson	Offensive linemen (OL): 72 Terron Armstead T; 73 Jahri Evans G; 76 Tony Hills T; 65 Senio Kelemete G/T; 68 Tim Lelito G; 77 Mike McGlynn C/G; 75 Andrus Peat G/T; 66 Ryan Seymour G; 64 Zach Strief T; 60 Max Unger C; Defensive linemen (DL): 90 Tavaris Barnes DE; 95 Tyeler Davison DT; 91 Kasim Edebali DE; 71 Kaleb Eulls DT; 58 Obum Gwacham DE; 92 John Jenkins DT; 94 Cameron Jordan DE; 78 Bobby Richardson DE; 93 Kevin Williams DT	Linebackers (LB): 50 Stephone Anthony MLB; 59 Dannell Ellerbe OLB; 57 David Hawthorne OLB; 53 Ramon Humber OLB; 42 James Anderson OLB; 44 Hau'oli Kikaha OLB; 56 Michael Mauti MLB; Defensive backs (DB): 40 Delvin Breaux CB; 39 Brandon Browner CB; 31 Jairus Byrd FS; 20 Brian Dixon CB; 30 Chris Owens CB; 33 Jamarca Sanford SS; 32 Kenny Vaccaro SS; 24 Kyle Wilson CB; Special teams (ST): 47 Justin Drescher LS; 5 Kai Forbath K; 6 Thomas Morstead P	Practice squad: 11 Reggie Bell WR; 41 Alden Darby FS; 37 Brandon Dixon CB; 26 Bronson Hill RB; 62 Cyril Lemon G (IR); 41 Jeff Luc OLB; 74 Ashaad Mabry DT; 86 Chris Manhertz TE; 69 Bryan Witzmann T; 19 Shane Wynn WR; Reserve: 97 Austin Brown DT (IR); 25 Rafael Bush FS (IR); 48 Kendall Hunter RB (IR); 22 Mark Ingram RB (IR); 21 Keenan Lewis CB (IR); 7 Luke McCown QB (IR); 23 Marcus Murphy RB (IR); 29 Khiry Robinson RB (IR); 28 C. J. Spiller RB (IR); 43 Vinnie Sunseri SS (IR); 27 Damian Swann CB (IR); 80 Jack Tabb TE (IR); 55 Davis Tull OLB (IR); 96 Lawrence Virgil DT (IR); 36 P. J. Williams CB (IR); Rookies in italics 53 active, 16 reserve, 9 practice squad

== Schedule ==
=== Preseason ===
Week	Date	Opponent	Result	Record	Venue	Recap
1	August 13	at Baltimore Ravens	L 27–30	0–1	M&T Bank Stadium	Recap
2	August 22	New England Patriots	L 24–26	0–2	Mercedes-Benz Superdome	Recap
3	August 30	Houston Texans	L 13–27	0–3	Mercedes-Benz Superdome	Recap
4	September 3	at Green Bay Packers	L 10–38	0–4	Lambeau Field	Recap

=== Regular season ===
Week	Date	Opponent	Result	Record	Venue	Recap
1	September 13	at Arizona Cardinals	L 19–31	0–1	University of Phoenix Stadium	Recap
2	September 20	Tampa Bay Buccaneers	L 19–26	0–2	Mercedes-Benz Superdome	Recap
3	September 27	at Carolina Panthers	L 22–27	0–3	Bank of America Stadium	Recap
4	October 4	Dallas Cowboys	W 26–20 (OT)	1–3	Mercedes-Benz Superdome	Recap
5	October 11	at Philadelphia Eagles	L 17–39	1–4	Lincoln Financial Field	Recap
6	October 15	Atlanta Falcons	W 31–21	2–4	Mercedes-Benz Superdome	Recap
7	October 25	at Indianapolis Colts	W 27–21	3–4	Lucas Oil Stadium	Recap
8	November 1	New York Giants	W 52–49	4–4	Mercedes-Benz Superdome	Recap
9	November 8	Tennessee Titans	L 28–34 (OT)	4–5	Mercedes-Benz Superdome	Recap
10	November 15	at Washington Redskins	L 14–47	4–6	FedExField	Recap
11	Bye					
12	November 29	at Houston Texans	L 6–24	4–7	NRG Stadium	Recap
13	December 6	Carolina Panthers	L 38–41	4–8	Mercedes-Benz Superdome	Recap
14	December 13	at Tampa Bay Buccaneers	W 24–17	5–8	Raymond James Stadium	Recap
15	December 21	Detroit Lions	L 27–35	5–9	Mercedes-Benz Superdome	Recap
16	December 27	Jacksonville Jaguars	W 38–27	6–9	Mercedes-Benz Superdome	Recap
17	January 3	at Atlanta Falcons	W 20–17	7–9	Georgia Dome	Recap

=== Game summaries ===
==== Week 1: at Arizona Cardinals ====
Week One: New Orleans Saints at Arizona Cardinals – Game summary

Quarter	1	2	3	4	Total
Saints	3	7	3	6	19
Cardinals	7	7	3	14	31

at University of Phoenix Stadium, Glendale, Arizona

- Date: September 13
- Game time: 3:05 p.m. CDT/1:05 p.m. Arizona time
- Game weather: Played indoors (retractable roof closed)
- Game attendance: 62,903
- Referee: Walt Anderson
- TV announcers (Fox): Kevin Burkhardt, John Lynch and Pam Oliver
- Recap, Gamebook

Game information

First quarter

- ARI – John Brown 10-yard pass from Carson Palmer (Chandler Catanzaro kick), 9:46. Cardinals 7–0.Drive: 9 plays, 80 yards, 5:14.
- NO – Zach Hocker 37-yard field goal, 3:55. Cardinals 7–3. Drive: 11 plays, 61 yards, 5:51.

Second quarter

- ARI – Andre Ellington 1-yard run (Chandler Catanzaro kick), 11:03. Cardinals 14–3. Drive: 5 plays, 88 yards, 3:04.
- NO – Brandon Coleman 12-yard pass from Drew Brees (Zach Hocker kick), 5:14. Cardinals 14–10. Drive: 12 plays, 80 yards, 5:49.

Third quarter

- NO – Zach Hocker 23-yard field goal, 12:01. Cardinals 14–13. Drive: 5 plays, 71 yards, 2:59.
- ARI – Chandler Catanzaro 43-yard field goal, 0:04. Cardinals 17–13. Drive: 5 plays, 35 yards, 2:11.

Fourth quarter

- NO – Zach Hocker 45-yard field goal, 12:24. Cardinals 17–16. Drive: 9 plays, 53 yards, 2:40.
- ARI – Darren Fells 17-yard pass from Carson Palmer (Chandler Catanzaro kick), 9:48. Cardinals 24–16. Drive: 5 plays, 80 yards, 2:36.
- NO – Zach Hocker 33-yard field goal, 6:45. Cardinals 24–19. Drive: 7 plays, 65 yards, 3:03.
- ARI – David Johnson 55-yard pass from Carson Palmer (Chandler Catanzaro kick), 1:33. Cardinals 31–19. Drive: 2 plays, 57 yards, 0:16.

Top passers

- NO – Drew Brees – 30/48, 355 yards, TD, INT
- ARI – Carson Palmer – 19/32, 132 yards, 3 TD

Top rushers

- NO – Mark Ingram II – 9 rushes, 24 yards
- ARI – Andre Ellington – 12 rushes, 69 yards, TD

Top receivers

- NO – Mark Ingram II – 8 rec, 98 yards
- ARI – Larry Fitzgerald – 6 rec, 87 yards

Turnovers

- NO – 1
- ARI – 1

With the loss, the Saints began 0–1.

==== Week 2: vs. Tampa Bay Buccaneers ====
Week Two: Tampa Bay Buccaneers at New Orleans Saints – Game summary

Quarter	1	2	3	4	Total
Buccaneers	3	7	13	3	26
Saints	0	7	0	12	19

at Mercedes-Benz Superdome, New Orleans, Louisiana

- Date: September 20
- Game time: 12:00 p.m. CDT
- Game weather: Played indoors (dome stadium)
- Game attendance: 73,006
- Referee: Carl Cheffers
- TV announcers (Fox): Chris Myers, Ronde Barber and Jennifer Hale
- Preview, Gamebook

Game information

First quarter

- TB – Kyle Brindza 55 yard field goal, 0:45. Buccaneers 3–0. Drive: 5 plays, 4 yards, 3:13.

Second quarter

- NO – Mark Ingram II 11 yard run (Zach Hocker kick), 1:23. Saints 7–3. Drive: 7 plays, 58 yards, 3:02.
- TB – Vincent Jackson 15 yard pass from Jameis Winston (Kyle Brindza kick), 0:12. Buccaneers 10–7. Drive: 6 plays, 63 yards, 1:11.

Third quarter

- TB – Jameis Winston 1 yard run (Kyle Brindza kick), 13:02. Buccaneers 17–7. Drive: 4 plays, 80 yards, 1:58.
- TB – Kyle Brindza 35 yard field goal, 6:04. Buccaneers 20–7. Drive: 10 plays, 31 yards, 5:10.
- TB – Kyle Brindza 22 yard field goal, 2:20. Buccaneers 23–7. Drive: 5 plays, 57 yards, 1:44.

Fourth quarter

- NO – Austin Johnson 1 yard run (two-point pass conversion failed), 10:17. Buccaneers 23–13. Drive: 14 plays, 80 yards, 7:03.
- NO – Willie Snead 16 yard pass from Drew Brees, 7:15. Buccaneers 23–19. Drive: 2 plays, 30 yards, 0:43.
- TB – Kyle Brindza 30 yard field goal, 1:51. Buccaneers 26–19. Drive: 5 plays, 21 yards, 1:07.

Top passers

- TB – Jameis Winston – 14/21, 207 yards, TD
- NO – Drew Brees – 24/38, 255 yards, TD, INT

Top rushers

- TB – Doug Martin – 21 rushes, 78 yards
- NO – Mark Ingram II – 16 rushes, 53 yards, TD

Top receivers

- TB – Louis Murphy – 3 rec, 82 yards
- NO – Marques Colston – 4 rec, 69 yards

Turnovers

- TB – 2
- NO – 3

Hoping to avoid an 0–2 start the Saints met Tampa Bay, led by new quarterback Jameis Winston.

The defense struggled to stop Winston as his heroics stunned New Orleans' home crowd.

Drew Brees left the game with an injured shoulder. The Saints wound up losing the game, 26–19.

==== Week 3: at Carolina Panthers ====
Week Three: New Orleans Saints at Carolina Panthers – Game summary

Quarter	1	2	3	4	Total
Saints	3	7	6	6	22
Panthers	0	10	10	7	27

at Bank of America Stadium, Charlotte, North Carolina

- Date: September 27
- Game time: 1:00 p.m. EDT/12:00 p.m. CDT
- Game weather: 69 °F (21 °C), rain
- Game attendance: 73,402
- Referee: Ed Hochuli
- TV announcers (Fox): Chris Myers, Ronde Barber and Jennifer Hale
- Recap, Gamebook

Game information

First quarter Second quarter Third quarter Fourth quarter

Top passers

- NO –
- CAR –

Top rushers

- NO –
- CAR –

Top receivers

- NO –
- CAR –

Top tacklers

- NO –
- CAR –

This game marked the first game Drew Brees missed as a Saint due to injury. Luke McCown, playing in relief of Brees, played well, throwing for 310 yards, before trying to hit Brandin Cooks in the end zone with roughly a minute left in the game. Josh Norman made a diving interception to seal the Panthers win and the Saints 0–3 start.

==== Week 4: vs. Dallas Cowboys ====
Week Four: Dallas Cowboys at New Orleans Saints – Game summary

Quarter	1	2	3	4	OT	Total
Cowboys	3	7	3	7	0	20
Saints	7	0	6	7	6	26

at Mercedes-Benz Superdome, New Orleans, Louisiana

- Date: October 4
- Game time: 7:30 p.m. CDT
- Game weather: Played indoors (dome stadium)
- Game attendance: 73,009
- Referee: Brad Allen
- TV announcers (NBC): Al Michaels, Cris Collinsworth and Michele Tafoya
- Recap, Gamebook

Game information

First quarter

- DAL – Dan Bailey 30-yard field goal, 9:46. Cowboys 3–0. Drive: 8 plays, 74 yards, 4:19.
- NO – Josh Hill 3-yard pass from Drew Brees (Zach Hocker kick), 3:52. Saints 7–3. Drive: 11 plays, 80 yards, 5:53.

Second quarter

- DAL – Joseph Randle 1-yard run (Dan Bailey kick), 13:37. Cowboys 10–7. Drive: 10 plays, 80 yards, 5:13.

Third quarter

- NO – Zach Hocker 51-yard field goal, 11:24. Tied 10–10. Drive: 4 plays, 5 yards, 1:23.
- DAL – Dan Bailey 38-yard field goal, 8:25. Cowboys 13–10. Drive: 8 plays, 60 yards, 2:59.
- NO – Zach Hocker 29-yard field goal, 1:30. Tied 13–13. Drive: 13 plays, 69 yards, 6:54.

Fourth quarter

- NO – Khiry Robinson 1-yard run (Zach Hocker kick), 8:02. Saints 20–13. Drive: 11 plays, 67 yards, 4:45.
- DAL – Terrance Williams 17-yard pass from Brandon Weeden (Dan Bailey kick), 1:56. Tied 20–20. Drive: 8 plays, 91 yards, 2:14.

Overtime

- NO – C. J. Spiller 80-yard pass from Drew Brees, 14:57. Saints 26–20. Drive: 2 plays, 80 yards, 0:13.

Top passers

- DAL – Brandon Weeden – 16/26, 246 yards, TD
- NO – Drew Brees – 33/41, 359 yards, 2 TD

Top rushers

- DAL – Lance Dunbar – 3 rushes, 54 yards
- NO – Mark Ingram II – 17 rushes, 77 yards

Top receivers

- DAL – Brice Butler – 1 reception, 67 yards
- NO – C. J. Spiller – 5 receptions, 99 yards, TD

Top tacklers

- DAL –
- NO –

In overtime, Drew Brees, who returned from an injured shoulder, nailed an 80-yard pass to C. J. Spiller for the game-winning touchdown. Brees now has 400 career touchdown passes. It was also the fastest regular season overtime in NFL history, with only 13 seconds being played before the touchdown.

This win would make the Lions the only winless team.

==== Week 5: at Philadelphia Eagles ====
Week Five: New Orleans Saints at Philadelphia Eagles – Game summary

Quarter	1	2	3	4	Total
Saints	7	0	3	7	17
Eagles	0	10	16	13	39

at Lincoln Financial Field, Philadelphia, Pennsylvania

- Date: October 11
- Game time: 1:00 p.m. EDT/12:00 p.m. CDT
- Game weather: 67 °F (19 °C), clear
- Game attendance: 69,296
- Referee: Ron Torbert
- TV announcers (Fox): Thom Brennaman, Charles Davis and Tony Siragusa
- Recap, Gamebook

Game information

First quarter Second quarter Third quarter Fourth quarter

Top passers

- NO –
- PHI –

Top rushers

- NO –
- PHI –

Top receivers

- NO –
- PHI –

Top tacklers

- NO –
- PHI –

The Saints returned to Philadelphia for their first meeting with the Eagles since their last second victory in the 2013 playoffs, but the Eagles would get their revenge in a blowout. With the loss, the Saints fell to 1–4. This also marked the Saints' first loss to the Eagles since the 2007 season.

==== Week 6: vs. Atlanta Falcons ====
Week Six: Atlanta Falcons at New Orleans Saints – Game summary

Quarter	1	2	3	4	Total
Falcons	0	7	0	14	21
Saints	14	0	10	7	31

at Mercedes-Benz Superdome, New Orleans, Louisiana

- Date: October 15
- Game time: 7:25 p.m. CDT
- Game weather: Played indoors (dome stadium)
- Game attendance: 73,018
- Referee: Gene Steratore
- TV announcers (CBS/NFLN): Jim Nantz, Phil Simms and Tracy Wolfson
- Recap, Gamebook

Game information

First quarter Second quarter Third quarter Fourth quarter

Top passers

- ATL –
- NO –

Top rushers

- ATL –
- NO –

Top receivers

- ATL –
- NO –

Top tacklers

- ATL –
- NO –

The Saints would upset the undefeated Falcons on Thursday Night Football. With the win, the Saints improved to 2–4.

==== Week 7: at Indianapolis Colts ====
Week Seven: New Orleans Saints at Indianapolis Colts – Game summary

Quarter	1	2	3	4	Total
Saints	7	13	7	0	27
Colts	0	0	14	7	21

at Lucas Oil Stadium, Indianapolis, Indiana

- Date: October 25
- Game time: 1:00 p.m. EDT/12:00 p.m. CDT
- Game weather: 55 °F (13 °C), mostly cloudy — retractable roof open
- Game attendance: 66,420
- Referee: Carl Cheffers
- TV announcers (Fox): Sam Rosen, John Lynch and Pam Oliver
- Recap, Gamebook

Game information

First quarter Second quarter Third quarter Fourth quarter

Top passers

- NO –
- IND –

Top rushers

- NO –
- IND –

Top receivers

- NO –
- IND –

Top tacklers

- NO –
- IND –

In a Super Bowl rematch between the teams, the Saints would lead 27–0 at one point. Indianapolis would make it 27–21, but New Orleans would hold on for the win. With the win, the Saints improved to 3–4.

==== Week 8: vs. New York Giants ====
Week Eight: New York Giants at New Orleans Saints – Game summary

Quarter	1	2	3	4	Total
Giants	7	14	7	21	49
Saints	14	14	14	10	52

at Mercedes-Benz Superdome, New Orleans, Louisiana

- Date: November 1
- Game time: 12:00 p.m. CST
- Game weather: Played indoors (dome stadium)
- Game attendance: 73,019
- Referee: Craig Wrolstad
- TV announcers (Fox): Kenny Albert, Daryl Johnston and Laura Okmin
- Recap, Gamebook

Game information

First quarter

- NYG – Odell Beckham Jr. 2 yard pass from Eli Manning (Josh Brown kick), 9:39. Giants 7–0. Drive: 10 plays, 60 yards, 4:01.
- NO – Willie Snead 34 yard pass from Drew Brees (Kai Forbath kick), 7:36. tied 7–7. Drive: 6 plays, 80 yards, 2:03.
- NO – Brandin Cooks 26 yard pass from Drew Brees (Kai Forbath kick), 2:24. Saints 14–7. Drive: 5 plays, 96 yards, 3:03.

Second quarter

- NYG – Odell Beckham Jr. 1 yard pass from Eli Manning (Josh Brown kick), 13:31. tied 14–14. Drive: 9 plays, 79 yards, 3:53.
- NO – Marques Colston 53 yard pass from Drew Brees (Kai Forbath kick), 11:05. Saints 21–14. Drive: 5 plays, 80 yards, 2:26.
- NO – Willie Snead 2 yard pass from Drew Brees (Kai Forbath kick), 1:46. Saints 28–14. Drive: 14 plays, 60 yards, 7:07.
- NYG – Shane Vereen 2 yard pass from Eli Manning (Josh Brown kick), 0:02. Saints 28–21. Drive: 10 plays, 80 yards, 1:44.

Third quarter

- NYG – Odell Beckham Jr. 50 yard pass from Eli Manning (Josh Brown kick), 12:58. tied 28–28. Drive: 4 plays, 65 yards, 2:02.
- NO – Brandin Cooks 21 yard pass from Drew Brees (Kai Forbath kick), 10:09. Saints 35–28. Drive: 8 plays, 80 yards, 2:49.
- NO – Benjamin Watson 20 yard pass from Drew Brees (Kai Forbath kick), 0:29. Saints 42–28. Drive: 9 plays, 80 yards, 3:46.

Fourth quarter

- NYG – Dwayne Harris 9 yard pass from Eli Manning (Josh Brown kick), 12:15. Saints 42–35. Drive: 11 plays, 80 yards, 3:14.
- NYG – Dwayne Harris 20 yard pass from Eli Manning (Josh Brown kick), 9:30. tied 42–42. Drive: 3 plays, 65 yards, 1:01.
- NYG – Trumaine McBride 63 yard interception return (Josh Brown kick), 7:11. Giants 49–42.
- NO – C. J. Spiller 9 yard pass from Drew Bress (Kai Forbath kick), 0:36. tied 49–49. Drive: 14 plays, 80 yards, 6:35.
- NO – Kai Forbath 50 yard field goal, 0:00. Saints 52–49. Drive: 1 play, 0 yards, 0:05.

Top passers

- NYG – Eli Manning 30/41, 350 yards, 6 TD
- NO – Drew Brees 39/50, 505 yards, 7 TD, 2 INT

Top rushers

- NYG – Rashad Jennings 10 carries, 54 yards
- NO – Mark Ingram II 16 carries, 80 yards

Top receivers

- NYG – Odell Beckham Jr. 8 receptions, 130 yards, 3 TD
- NO – Benjamin Watson 9 receptions, 147 yards, TD

In a battle of passing offenses, Drew Brees threw a career-high 7 touchdown passes. The game was tied 49-49 late in the fourth quarter and the Saints returned a punt for 50 yards, good for the game-winning field goal to seal the Saints 52–49 victory.

==== Week 9: vs. Tennessee Titans ====
Week Nine: Tennessee Titans at New Orleans Saints – Game summary

Quarter	1	2	3	4	OT	Total
Titans	10	7	3	8	6	34
Saints	14	7	0	7	0	28

at Mercedes-Benz Superdome, New Orleans, Louisiana

- Date: November 8
- Game time: 12:00 p.m. CST
- Game weather: Played indoors (dome stadium)
- Game attendance: 73,075
- Referee: Jerome Boger
- TV announcers (CBS): Kevin Harlan and Rich Gannon
- Recap, Gamebook

Game information

First quarter Second quarter Third quarter Fourth quarter

Top passers

- TEN –
- NO –

Top rushers

- TEN –
- NO –

Top receivers

- TEN –
- NO –

Top tacklers

- TEN –
- NO –

New Orleans would lead 28–20 with 7 minutes left, but the Titans would go down the field to tie it at 28. The Titans would then win the game after Marcus Mariota won it with a touchdown to Anthony Fasano.

With the loss, the Saints fell to 4–5.

==== Week 10: at Washington Redskins ====
Week Ten: New Orleans Saints at Washington Redskins – Game summary

Quarter	1	2	3	4	Total
Saints	7	7	0	0	14
Redskins	14	13	10	10	47

at FedExField, Landover, Maryland

- Date: November 15
- Game time: 1:00 p.m. EST/12:00 p.m. CST
- Game weather: 61 °F (16 °C), sunny
- Game attendance: 75,086
- Referee: John Parry
- TV announcers (Fox): Kenny Albert, Daryl Johnston and Laura Okmin
- Recap, Gamebook

Game information

First quarter Second quarter Third quarter Fourth quarter

Top passers

- NO –
- WAS –

Top rushers

- NO –
- WAS –

Top receivers

- NO –
- WAS –

Top tacklers

- NO –
- WAS –

Traveling to Washington to take on the Redskins, Drew Brees and the Saints suffered a moment of embarrassment as they would go on to be blown out 47–14. Kirk Cousins threw a career-high four touchdowns in the blowout.

A day after, the Saints fired defensive coordinator Rob Ryan, replacing him with Dennis Allen, who would take over for Ryan for the remainder of the season.

==== Week 12: at Houston Texans ====
Week Twelve: New Orleans Saints at Houston Texans – Game summary

Quarter	1	2	3	4	Total
Saints	0	6	0	0	6
Texans	14	0	10	0	24

at NRG Stadium, Houston, Texas

- Date: November 29
- Game time: 12:00 p.m. CST
- Game weather: 54 °F (12 °C), cloudy
- Game attendance: 71,778
- Referee: John Hussey
- TV announcers (Fox): Joe Davis, David Diehl and Kristina Pink
- Recap, Gamebook

Game information

First quarter Second quarter Third quarter Fourth quarter

Top passers

- NO –
- HOU –

Top rushers

- NO –
- HOU –

Top receivers

- NO –
- HOU –

Top tacklers

- NO –
- HOU –

The Week 12 clash against the Houston Texans would be no better than how the previous game unfolded, with the Saints offense being held to only two field goals (failing to score a touchdown for the first time since Christmas Eve 2005) and Brees failing to throw a touchdown pass the entire game, snapping his 45-game streak of doing so.

With the loss, the Saints fell to 4–6.

==== Week 13: vs. Carolina Panthers ====
Week Thirteen: Carolina Panthers at New Orleans Saints – Game summary

Quarter	1	2	3	4	Total
Panthers	0	13	14	14	41
Saints	14	2	8	14	38

at Mercedes-Benz Superdome, New Orleans, Louisiana

- Date: December 6
- Game time: 3:25 p.m. CST
- Game weather: Played indoors (dome stadium)
- Game attendance: 73,097
- Referee: Brad Allen
- TV announcers (Fox): Joe Buck, Troy Aikman and Erin Andrews
- Recap, Gamebook

Game information

First quarter Second quarter Third quarter Fourth quarter

Top passers

- CAR –
- NO –

Top rushers

- CAR –
- NO –

Top receivers

- CAR –
- NO –

Top tacklers

- CAR –
- NO –

The Saints made history in this game, becoming the first team in NFL history to block an extra point and return it for two points under new NFL rules that took effect that season (prior to this season, NFL rules did not allow players to return a blocked extra point). Saints rookie Stephone Anthony was the one who returned it, with Kevin Williams blocking it. The Saints, unfortunately, would eventually lose in a shootout and dropped their record to 4–8.

==== Week 14: at Tampa Bay Buccaneers ====
Week Fourteen: New Orleans Saints at Tampa Bay Buccaneers – Game summary

Quarter	1	2	3	4	Total
Saints	7	10	7	0	24
Buccaneers	0	10	0	7	17

at Raymond James Stadium, Tampa, Florida

- Date: December 13
- Game time: 1:00 p.m. EST/12:00 p.m. CST
- Game weather: 81 °F (27 °C), cloudy
- Game attendance: 62,138
- Referee: Clete Blakeman
- TV announcers (Fox): Dick Stockton, David Diehl and Kristina Pink
- Recap, Gamebook

Game information

First quarter Second quarter Third quarter Fourth quarter

Top passers

- NO –
- TB –

Top rushers

- NO –
- TB –

Top receivers

- NO –
- TB –

Top tacklers

- NO –
- TB –

The highlight of the game was Drew Brees passing Dan Marino for 4th on the league's all-time passing touchdowns list.

==== Week 15: vs. Detroit Lions ====
Week Fifteen: Detroit Lions at New Orleans Saints – Game summary

Quarter	1	2	3	4	Total
Lions	7	14	7	7	35
Saints	3	0	7	17	27

at Mercedes-Benz Superdome, New Orleans, Louisiana

- Date: December 21
- Game time: 7:30 p.m. CST
- Game weather: Played indoors (dome stadium)
- Game attendance: 73,017
- Referee: Pete Morelli
- TV announcers (ESPN): Mike Tirico, Jon Gruden and Lisa Salters
- Reacp, Gamebook

Game information

First quarter Second quarter Third quarter Fourth quarter

Top passers

- DET –
- NO –

Top rushers

- DET –
- NO –

Top receivers

- DET –
- NO –

Top tacklers

- DET –
- NO –

With the loss, the Saints fell to 5–9.

==== Week 16: vs. Jacksonville Jaguars ====
Week Sixteen: Jacksonville Jaguars at New Orleans Saints – Game summary

Quarter	1	2	3	4	Total
Jaguars	0	6	13	8	27
Saints	14	10	7	7	38

at Mercedes-Benz Superdome, New Orleans, Louisiana

- Date: December 27
- Game time: 3:05 p.m. CST
- Game weather: Played indoors (dome stadium)
- Game attendance: 73,064
- Referee: Ron Torbert
- TV announcers (CBS): Andrew Catalon, Steve Beuerlein and Steve Tasker
- Recap, Gamebook

Game information

First quarter Second quarter Third quarter Fourth quarter

Top passers

- JAX –
- NO –

Top rushers

- JAX –
- NO –

Top receivers

- JAX –
- NO –

Top tacklers

- JAX –
- NO –

With the win, the Saints improved to 6–9.

==== Week 17: at Atlanta Falcons ====
Week Seventeen: New Orleans Saints at Atlanta Falcons – Game summary

Quarter	1	2	3	4	Total
Saints	7	7	3	3	20
Falcons	3	14	0	0	17

at Georgia Dome, Atlanta, Georgia

- Date: January 3, 2016
- Game time: 1:00 p.m. EST/12:00 p.m. CST
- Game weather: Played indoors (dome stadium)
- Game attendance: 69,699
- Referee: Craig Wrolstad
- TV announcers (Fox): Sam Rosen, Matt Millen and Peter Schrager
- Recap, Gamebook

Game information

First quarter Second quarter Third quarter Fourth quarter

Top passers

- NO –
- ATL –

Top rushers

- NO –
- ATL –

Top receivers

- NO –
- ATL –

Top tacklers

- NO –
- ATL –

With the win, the Saints ended their season 7-9 for the second straight season. This also marked the first sweep against the Falcons since 2013.

== Standings ==
=== Division ===
NFC South
	W	L	T	PCT	DIV	CONF	PF	PA	STK
^{(1)} Carolina Panthers	15	1	0	.938	5–1	11–1	500	308	W1
Atlanta Falcons	8	8	0	.500	1–5	5–7	339	345	L1
New Orleans Saints	7	9	0	.438	3–3	5–7	408	476	W2
Tampa Bay Buccaneers	6	10	0	.375	3–3	5–7	342	417	L4

=== Conference ===
NFC
#	Team	Division	W	L	T	PCT	DIV	CONF	SOS	SOV	STK
Division Leaders
1	Carolina Panthers	South	15	1	0	.938	5–1	11–1	.441	.438	W1
2	Arizona Cardinals	West	13	3	0	.813	4–2	10–2	.477	.457	L1
3	Minnesota Vikings	North	11	5	0	.688	5–1	8–4	.504	.449	W3
4	Washington Redskins	East	9	7	0	.563	4–2	8–4	.465	.403	W4
Wild Cards
5 (Note: Green Bay finished ahead of Seattle based on head-to-head victory.)	Green Bay Packers	North	10	6	0	.625	3–3	7–5	.531	.450	L2
6	Seattle Seahawks	West	10	6	0	.625	3–3	7–5	.520	.431	W1
Did not qualify for the postseason
7	Atlanta Falcons	South	8	8	0	.500	1–5	5–7	.480	.453	L1
8 (Note: St. Louis and Detroit finished ahead of Philadelphia and New Orleans based on conference record. St. Louis finished ahead of Detroit based on head-to-head victory. Detroit finished ahead of Philadelphia and New Orleans based on head-to-head sweep, while Philadelphia finished ahead of New Orleans based on head-to-head victory.)	St. Louis Rams	West	7	9	0	.438	4–2	6–6	.527	.482	L1
9	Detroit Lions	North	7	9	0	.438	3–3	6–6	.535	.429	W3
10	Philadelphia Eagles	East	7	9	0	.438	3–3	4–8	.508	.473	W1
11	New Orleans Saints	South	7	9	0	.438	3–3	5–7	.504	.402	W2
12 (Note: The New York Giants and Chicago each finished ahead of Tampa Bay based on head-to-head victory, while the Giants finished ahead of Chicago based on conference record.)	New York Giants	East	6	10	0	.375	2–4	4–8	.500	.396	L3
13	Chicago Bears	North	6	10	0	.375	1–5	3–9	.547	.469	L1
14	Tampa Bay Buccaneers	South	6	10	0	.375	3–3	5–7	.484	.406	L4
15	San Francisco 49ers	West	5	11	0	.313	1–5	4–8	.539	.463	W1
16	Dallas Cowboys	East	4	12	0	.250	3–3	3–9	.531	.438	L4
Tiebreakers (Note: When breaking ties for three or more teams under the NFL's rules, they are first broken within divisions, then comparing only the highest-ranked remaining team from each division.)
