= Randy Phillips (airman) =

American activist

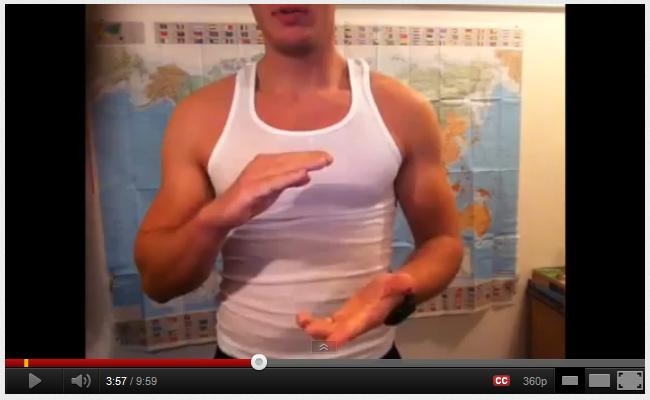
Phillips appearing anonymously in a video posted on YouTube on September 6, 2011

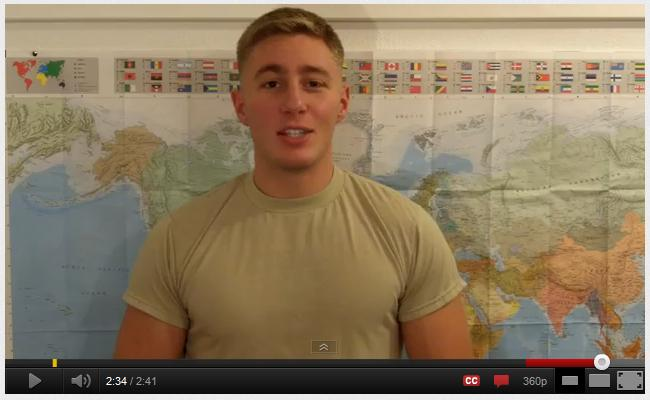
Phillips appearing as himself in a video posted on YouTube on October 29, 2011

Randy Phillips (born May 8, 1990) is an airman of the United States Air Force whose coming out in September 2011 following the repeal of the "Don't ask, don't tell" policy (DADT) garnered media attention. DADT had banned the service of openly gay members in the United States Armed Forces and Phillips used YouTube, under the alias "AreYouSuprised", to anonymously seek support and to document his life under the policy over several months. His videos included his coming out to his father and mother, which coincided with Phillips showing his face for the first time, and the accidental discovery of his anonymous web presence by his co-workers.

There was a wave of video postings when the military anti-homosexual policy ended, with many pointing to Phillips as their model or inspiration. The timing of his revelations to his family at the end of the military's restrictions on service by homosexuals made him, in one journalist's estimation, "the poster boy for the DADT repeal." Another wrote: "Phillips has masterfully used social media and good timing to place himself at the centre of a civil rights success story."

== Background ==
Born Steven Randy Phillips in Eclectic, Alabama, on May 8, 1990, Phillips graduated from Elmore County High School in May 2008. His high school sports were baseball and wrestling. He began a six-year enlistment in the U.S. Air Force on March 17, 2009. At the time, the U.S. military permitted homosexuals to serve in its ranks under its "Don't ask, don't tell" policy established in 1993, which limited service by homosexuals to those who did not reveal their sexual orientation. A statute repealing the DADT policy was enacted in December 2010, with the change in policy delayed until military and government officials certified that plans were in place for its smooth implementation. The date when homosexuals could serve openly in the military remained uncertain and Congressional efforts to prevent the change in policy from going into effect continued during the spring of 2011.

== Social media campaign ==
While deployed in Southwest Asia in April 2011, Phillips, a senior airman since March 15, became determined to reveal his homosexuality. To seek support, he launched a social media campaign by posting videos on YouTube and messages on Twitter, under the anonymous heading "AreYouSuprised." He described himself as a "military member in the closet, using social media to build up the courage to come out to family, my girlfriend, friends and coworkers." The Twitter account identified him as "Just an average GI, who happens to be gay." In a series of thirteen videos posted over the next five months, he asked the public for advice and encouragement. The motivation behind his social media campaign was to build support to help in his coming out, he himself describing it as "selfish". Another motivation was to share his experience so that other closeted homosexuals could learn from it.

In his YouTube and Twitter postings, he revealed only general details about his identity and filmed himself so that only his headless torso could be seen. He gave varying estimates of the time he thought it would take to complete his disclosure process, at one point announcing his determination to come out to his family by the end of 2012.

=== Southwest Asia postings ===
In his initial video posted from an undisclosed location in Southwest Asia on April 18, he said it "may take a year or so for this to finally get over with", described himself as "one hundred percent closeted" and said: "The whole point of this video is to come out. That's even hard to say." Though always saying he knew he was "different" when he was still in elementary school, "really young," he described his long-held belief that his homosexual inclinations represented a phase, a view he held when he joined the Air Force. When posted to Europe in 2010, he discovered that homosexuality in Germany was "completely different than America...more accepted" and that changed his view of himself: "when you see things...and you kinda see where you fit into society." He struggled to describe his self-acceptance, noting that choosing to be heterosexual would be "easier all the way around" while homosexuality meant "going against the grain." He noted negative attitudes toward homosexuality in the area where he grew up and in the military, but ended his account: "It's not a choice. It's the way I was born and it's a big stumbling block." His concerns focused on his parents' reaction: "I wish this wasn't something that wasn't expected of me. I wish I went along with what my parents planned for me, and what they thought I would develop into, and it's not."

Phillips used secluded locations for several of the videos he posted from Southwest Asia, including a bunker and the inside of a bus. He taped others outdoors and kept looking left and right to make sure no one else was coming within earshot.

Discussing the repeal of DADT in the context of the American civil rights movement, Phillips said repeal of DADT was "a huge move in American civil rights and...there have been bigger things like abolishing slavery, giving women the right to vote, getting rid of segregation, and those have all been great, but this is huge for our generation." He reported another closeted airman's fear of disclosing his sexual orientation, and recounted his own repeated failures to follow through on self-imposed deadlines to come out to a friend. He discussed his YouTube postings with another closeted serviceman, though in his later remarks Phillips never counted their shared knowledge of each other's homosexuality as part of his coming out in the military. Prompted by that serviceman's questions, he allowed that his use of social media might represent a "subconscious" attempt to allow others to discover his sexuality on their own and spare him the decision to come out.

Phillips turned twenty-one early in May and on May 25, he posted a video report on the training session he attended about the repeal of DADT, writing in a Twitter message: "Don't Ask, Don't Tell training was this morning. It was a great presentation that nobody listened to."

On June 5, he reported via video that he had come out to a member of the military in late May. After reacting disrespectfully to the casual use of the word "faggot" in his work group, he apologized the next day in private to his immediate supervisor in the Air Force and told him that he was gay. Later he wrote on Twitter: "It has been kinda awkward since I told my boss, but he has only called me faggot about twice since." On July 7 he came out to a friend and fellow airman who reacted positively. Phillips posted a video of the conversation immediately, though he did not tell the friend his response was publicly available on YouTube for another month.

On July 22, 2011, U.S. military and government officials set the start of the new policy allowing gays and lesbians to serve openly for September 20. When Phillips discussed the announcement in a video, he was still worrying about coming out to a co-worker who, unaware of Phillips' homosexuality, said he did not "work well with gay people.".

On August 12, Phillips posted three videos of a band that visited his deployment and performed for a small group of military service members. These videos received more than 17,000 views overnight, a level of activity far in excess of the several hundred views Phillips' postings were attracting. When Phillips' co-workers discovered the music performances on a YouTube site dedicated to DADT and a serviceman's coming out process, he left the room while they watched his anonymous postings. He returned to general applause and congratulations. He later reported: "A lot of people were OK with it. A lot of people were more than OK with it." He also reported that he had come out to his girlfriend in Alabama, wanted to "play by the book and respect those rules" as long as DADT remained in effect, and promised to show his face "When I get comfortable."

=== Germany postings ===
As the end of DADT neared, Phillips and his unit returned from Southwest Asia to their posting at Ramstein Air Base in Germany. He anticipated that the day following the end of DADT would not be unusual: "I'm not going to have a parade...It's going to be like another day." On September 14 he posted a video contribution to the It Gets Better Project and, still hiding his face, said he had been "very happy lately." On September 18, Phillips attended the annual Gay Festival day at Munich's Oktoberfest, part of a U.S. military contingent organized by two organizations of gay and lesbian servicemembers, OutServe and the Servicemembers Legal Defense Network.

On the evening of September 19, when it was already early morning of September 20 in Germany, Phillips telephoned his father in Alabama, whom he had not seen for a year. After a few minutes, Phillips said: "Dad, I'm gay. I always have been. I've known for...forever." Phillips then asked his father "Will you still love me?" and his father replied: "I still love you, son. Yes, I still love you." He posted a video showing his side of the conversation as well as his father's voice minutes later, with the caption: "I called my dad to tell him the hardest thing that gay guys will ever have to say."

NPR said "The video is dramatic and nerve-wracking and it's obviously struck a chord: By this afternoon [September 20] it had garnered about 65,000 views." It was viewed more than 4.6 million times by September 29, featured on the main page of the It Gets Better Project, and made available on a variety of foreign-language news sites.

When Phillips' father learned that his son had made their conversation available on YouTube, he was surprised and not pleased, but said it did not alter his feelings. In an interview with ABC News on September 21, Phillips said: "It feels great. It's nice not having to look over your shoulder or worry about who you are talking to. I never thought I'd be so comfortable with it but it's very supportive. Everybody's been so great."

Comments posted on YouTube were largely favorable, but one commentator noted some "stomach-churning homophobia in the mix." One comment, for example, read: "You need to be locked up for molesting children." More typical comments found much to praise: "The courage and candor with which you exposed your heart to the world, and specifically your quintessential human attribute, the desire to be loved, combined with your obvious virtues, and the nature of your occupation, have made you a rare and exemplary role model not just for bisexual, gay, and transgendered [sic] American youth, but for anyone who has ever questioned the temperature of the world, or convictions of their safety net." In the following days, other military servicemembers marked the end of DADT by revealing their homosexuality publicly, some via social media, included some in long-term relationships or marriages.

Phillips spoke with his mother just minutes after his call to his father. The conversation was more difficult. In one account: "During the 21-minute emotional video Phillips is mostly met with stoney silence. His mother finally asks, "When did this come about?" to which he responds "I've always known -- I've always, always, always known." Phillips posted the video of this conversation on September 29.

=== Press ===
Press assessments attributed the impact of Phillips' videos on news coverage and others who used social media to announce their homosexuality to his ability as a "natural storyteller." Another wrote that "Phillips presents himself as a thoughtful, grounded young man. He's frank without being timid or confrontational." According to a writer in The Atlantic, "no single story has broken through following the recent repeal of Don't Ask, Don't Tell...like Phillips' has." "Phillips," wrote a Canadian journalist, "with his highlights, muscles and Bill-Clinton-accent, is sweet enough to give you cavities. He's well-spoken and mannered, clearly intelligent and sensitive. He calls his father 'daddy' and 'sir' with equal sincerity."

Some had reservations about Phillips' decision to make his conversations with his parents public. Mary Elizabeth Williams in Salon described the videos as having an "ambush" aspect and thought "the drama of his family's spontaneous reactions is mitigated by the implied intrusiveness of sharing them with the world." Another writer noted that it was easier for Phillips to speak honestly of his sexuality to his father than to announce "Dad I've been airing my (dirty) laundry on the internet for months now, and you're about to get right in the middle of it. Expect phone calls."

== Later activity ==
Phillips continued his gay rights activism by posting videos in support of the It Gets Better Project and National Coming Out Day. His story was repeated in news coverage of the first anniversary of the repeal of DADT in December 2011 and in year-end reviews of the news of 2011. When Andrew Sullivan praised the year's progress in civil rights for gays and lesbians, he used an image of Phillips on the phone to his father to illustrate "gay people and their families and friends in daily acts of courage and candor and conversation."

When YouTube included Phillips' video coming out to his father on its list of the "Top Videos of 2011", CBS News described it as "one of the best examples of humanity broadcast to the video site's community."

In January 2012, Phillips changed the emphasis of his social media activities to present a more complete picture of himself than his initial coming out project allowed, to "show the world that I'm just a regular boring red-blooded American guy and there's nothing special about me." On January 22, he announced his participation in the June 2012 AIDS/LifeCycle, a 545-mile bicycle ride from San Francisco to Los Angeles that raises funds to support HIV services provided by the Los Angeles Gay and Lesbian Center and the San Francisco AIDS Foundation. He said he wanted his generation to engage with the reality of AIDS and the need to fight for a cure.

Phillips' last day in the Air Force was May 9, 2014. He later settled in San Diego and established a business that offers boat tours of San Diego Bay.
