= Travis Pearson =

American football player and coach (born 1971)

Birmingham Stallions
- Title: Defensive backs coach

Personal information
- Born: July 25, 1971 (age 55); Silas, Alabama, U.S.
- Listed height: 6 ft 0 in (1.83 m)
- Listed weight: 217 lb (98 kg)

Career information
- Position: Fullback / Linebacker
- College: Alabama State

Career history

Playing
- Tampa Bay Storm (1994); Miami Hooters (1995); Florida Bobcats (1996–1999); Los Angeles Avengers (2001)

Coaching
- Central HS (1998–1999) Head coach; Elmore County HS (2000–2001) Assistant coach; Elmore County HS (2002–2004) Head coach; Oxford HS (2005–2006) Defensive coordinator; Iowa State (2007–2008) Director of football operations; Jefferson Davis HS (2009–2010) Head coach & athletic director; Colquitt County HS (2011–2012) Defensive coordinator; South Alabama (2013) Linebackers coach; South Alabama (2014–2015) Defensive coordinator; Alabama A&M (2016–2017) Defensive coordinator & secondary coach; Alabama State (2018) Safeties coach; Alabama State (2019–2021) Defensive coordinator; Alabama State (2021) Interim head coach; Troy (2022–2024) Cornerbacks coach; Georgia State (2025) Defensive coordinator; Birmingham Stallions (2026–present) Defensive backs coach

Awards and highlights
- Second-team Arena Football League 15th Anniversary Team (2001)
- Stats at ArenaFan.com

Travis Pearson (born July 25, 1971) is an American college football coach and former professional player who is currently the defensive backs coach for the Birmingham Stallions of the United Football League (UFL). He played seven seasons in the Arena Football League (AFL) with the Tampa Bay Storm, Miami Hooters, Florida Bobcats and Los Angeles Avengers. He played college football at Alabama State University. He was named to the Arena Football League 15th Anniversary Team in 2001.

== Professional career ==
Pearson played for the Tampa Bay Storm, Miami Hooters, Florida Bobcats and Los Angeles Avengers of the AFL from 1994 to 2001.

== Coaching career ==
Pearson was the head coach at Central High School in Hayneville, Alabama from 1998 to 1999. He was an assistant coach at Elmore County High School in Eclectic, Alabama from 2000 to 2001. He was then Elmore's head coach from 2002 to 2004. He was the defensive coordinator at Oxford High School in Oxford, Alabama from 2005 to 2006.

He was the director of football operations for the Iowa State Cyclones of Iowa State University from 2007 to 2008. He served as head coach and athletic director at Jefferson Davis High School in Montgomery, Alabama from 2009 to 2010. He was the defensive coordinator at Colquitt County High School in Moultrie, Georgia from 2011 to 2012.

Pearson was the linebackers coach for the South Alabama Jaguars of the University of South Alabama in 2013. He then served as the Jaguars' defensive coordinator from 2014 to 2015. He became the defensive coordinator and secondary coach of the Alabama A&M Bulldogs in 2016.

== Head coaching record ==
=== College ===
| Year | Team | Overall | Conference | Standing | Bowl/playoffs |
|---|---|---|---|---|---|
Alabama State Hornets (Southwestern Athletic Conference) (2021)
| 2021 | Alabama State | 2–2 | 1–2 | T–4th (East) | |
| Alabama State: | | 2–2 | 1–2 | | |
| Total: | | 2–2 | | | |
