= Cameron Jordan =

American football player (born 1989)

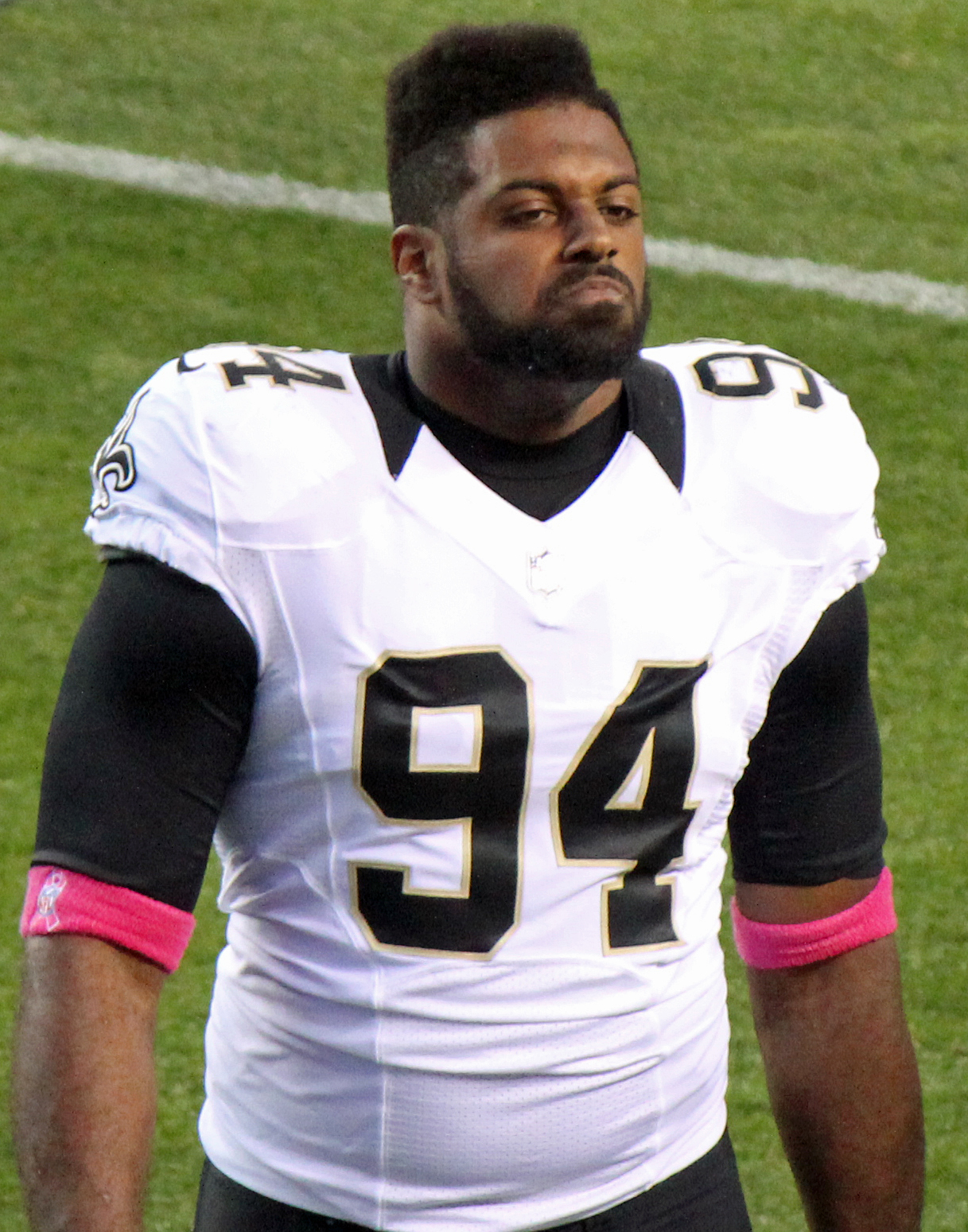
- Jordan with the New Orleans Saints in 2012

No. 94 – New Orleans Saints
- Position: Defensive end
- Roster status: Active

Personal information
- Born: July 10, 1989 (age 37); Chandler, Arizona, U.S.
- Listed height: 6 ft 4 in (1.93 m)
- Listed weight: 287 lb (130 kg)

Career information
- High school: Chandler
- College: California (2007–2010)
- NFL draft: 2011: 1st round, 24th overall pick

Career history
- New Orleans Saints (2011–present)

Awards and highlights
- First-team All-Pro (2017); 2× Second-team All-Pro (2018, 2019); 8× Pro Bowl (2013, 2015, 2017–2022); NFL 2010s All-Decade Team; First-team All-Pac-10 (2010)

Career NFL statistics as of Week 11, 2026
- Total tackles: 778
- Sacks: 132.0
- Forced fumbles: 17
- Fumble recoveries: 12
- Interceptions: 3
- Defensive touchdowns: 1
- Stats at Pro Football Reference

Cameron Tyler Jordan (born July 10, 1989) is an American professional football defensive end for the New Orleans Saints of the National Football League (NFL). He played college football for the California Golden Bears, and was selected by the Saints in the first round of the 2011 NFL draft. A member of the NFL 2010s All-Decade Team, Jordan is an eight-time Pro Bowler, a three-time All-Pro selection, is the Saints' all-time franchise sack leader, and currently ranks 17th all-time in sacks.

== Early life ==
Jordan was born in Chandler, Arizona, the son of former Minnesota Vikings tight end Steve Jordan. He attended Chandler High School in Chandler, Arizona, where he was a two-sport star in football and track for the Chandler Wolves. In football, he earned All-State honors his senior year after registering 85 tackles and 17.5 quarterback sacks. Regarded as a three-star recruit by Rivals.com, Jordan was listed as the #37 strongside defensive end of the class of 2007.

Also an outstanding track & field athlete, Jordan was one of the state's top performers in the discus throw. He captured the state title in the discus at the 2007 5A I State Meet, recording a top-throw of 53.54 meters (175 ft 7 in), while also placing 10th in the shot put event, with a throw of 14.01 meters (45 ft, 11 in).

== College career ==
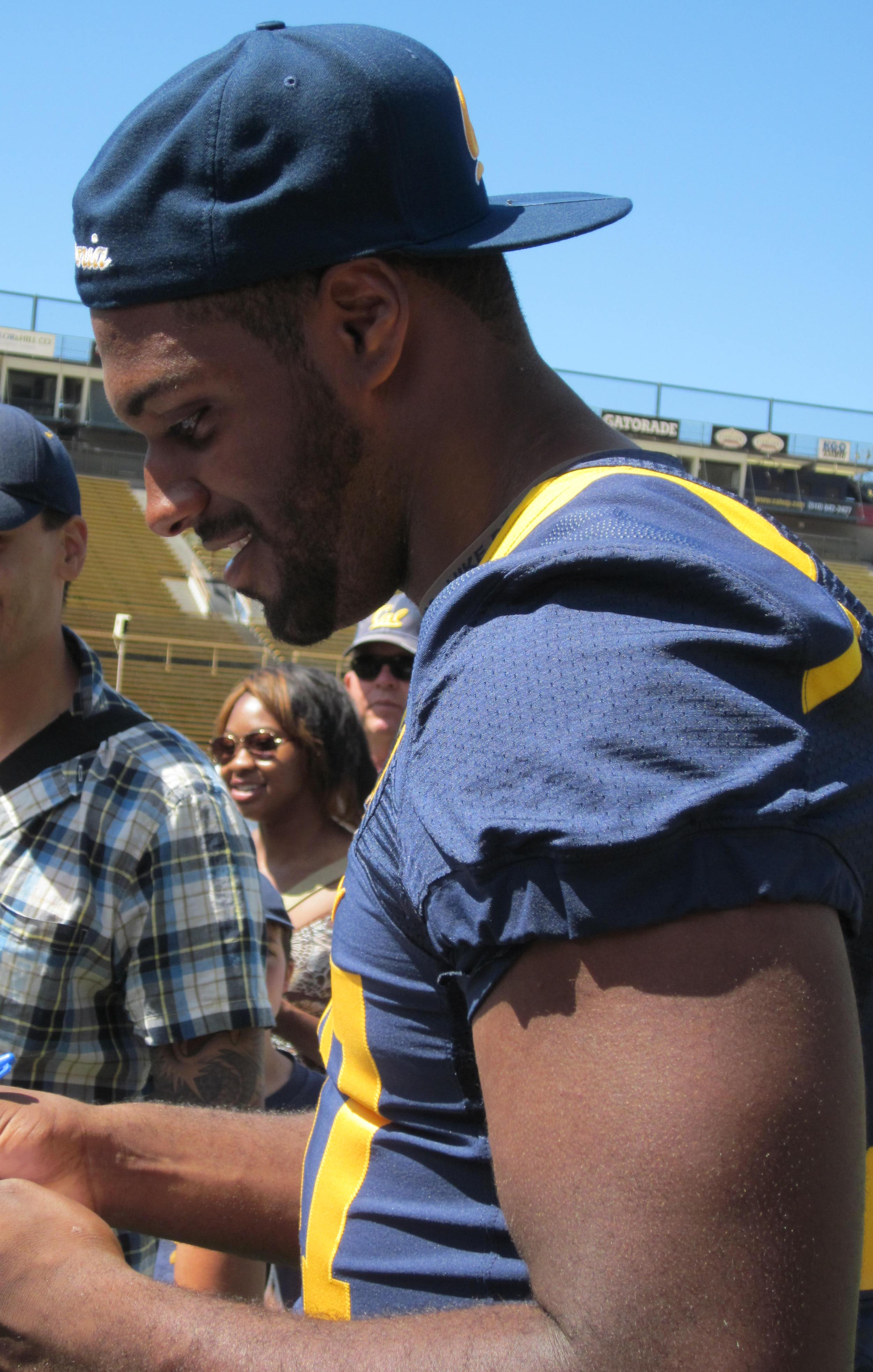
Jordan during his tenure at Cal in August 2010

Jordan primarily played defensive end for the University of California at Berkeley. He was coached by head coach Jeff Tedford and defensive coordinator Bob Gregory. He played in 50 of 51 possible games and made 32 starts at California from 2007 to 2010. Jordan achieved honorable mention All-American (Pro Football Weekly) and first-team All-Pac-10 Conference choice as a senior in 2010 after two consecutive honorable mention All-Pac-10 campaigns in 2008 and 2009.

He finished his collegiate career with 175 tackles, while adding 34.0 tackles for loss (−122 yards) and 16.5 sacks (−89 yards) to rank just outside the school's all-time top 10 in each of the latter two categories. He also had one interception that he returned for three yards, five pass breakups, four forced fumbles and five fumble recoveries that he returned for a total of 41 yards and two touchdowns.

== Professional career ==
=== Pre-draft ===
On January 29, 2011, Jordan played in the 2011 Senior Bowl and was part of Marvin Lewis's North team that lost 24–10 to the South. His overall performance during Senior Bowl practice helped his draft stock and made him a definitive first round pick in the upcoming draft. Jordan attended the NFL Scouting Combine and performed all of the combine and positional drills.

"He gives you a lot of scheme versatility. He had a great year, a great Senior Bowl and a great combine. If Cameron Jordan went in the top 10, nobody would rip that pick based on the way he played and how he performed at the two key venues."

— Mel Kiper Jr.

On March 9, 2011, he participated at California's pro day, but opted to stand on his combine numbers and only performed defensive end drills. At the conclusion of the pre-draft process, Jordan was projected to be a first round pick by NFL draft experts and scouts. He was ranked as the second best defensive end prospect in the draft by DraftScout.com and Sports Illustrated and was ranked the third best defensive end in the draft by NFL analysts Gil Brandt and Brian Billick.

External videos
- Cameron Jordan's NFL Combine Workout
- NFL Combine Interview: Cameron Jordan

Pre-draft measurables
Height	Weight	Arm length	Hand span	Wingspan	40-yard dash	10-yard split	20-yard split	20-yard shuttle	Three-cone drill	Vertical jump	Broad jump	Bench press
6 ft 4 1/8 in (1.93 m)	287 lb (130 kg)	35 in (0.89 m)	11 1/8 in (0.28 m)	6 ft 10 3/8 in (2.09 m)	4.76 s	1.71 s	2.77 s	4.37 s	7.07 s	31 in (0.79 m)	9 ft 9 in (2.97 m)	25 reps
All values from NFL Combine

=== 2011 ===
The New Orleans Saints selected Jordan in the first round (24th overall) of the 2011 NFL draft. Jordan was the fifth defensive end drafted in 2011, behind J. J. Watt, Robert Quinn, Ryan Kerrigan, and Adrian Clayborn. He was mistakenly called by the Cleveland Browns after the draft ended, who meant to call USC tight-end Jordan Cameron for "Biographical Information".

External videos
- Saints draft Cameron Jordan 24th overall
- First Draft: Cameron Jordan
- NFL Draft Profile: Cameron Jordan

On August 2, 2011, the Saints signed Jordan to a four-year, $7.73 million contract that includes $6.30 million guaranteed and a signing bonus of $4.12 million.

Jordan entered training camp slated as a starter, but saw competition for his job after the Saints signed veteran free agent Turk McBride. Head coach Sean Payton named Jordan and McBride the starting defensive ends to begin the regular season after Will Smith was suspended for the first two games of the regular season.

He made his professional regular season debut and first career start in the Saints' season-opener at the Green Bay Packers and made three combined tackles in their 42–34 loss. Jordan made his first career tackle on running back Ryan Grant and ended a four-yard rush on the opening drive. On October 16, 2011, Jordan collected a season-high six combined tackles in the Saints' 26–20 loss at the Tampa Bay Buccaneers in Week 6. On January 1, 2012, Jordan recorded three combined tackles and made his first career sack during a 45–17 win against the Carolina Panthers in Week 17. Jordan sacked quarterback Cam Newton for a five-yard loss in the second quarter, but was penalized for a horse collar tackle. Jordan finished his rookie season in 2011 with 31 combined tackles (18 solo), four pass deflections, and a sack in 16 games and 15 starts.

The Saints finished first in the NFC South with a 13–3 record and earned a playoff berth. On January 7, 2012, Jordan appeared in his first career playoff game and made one tackle in the Saints' 45–28 victory against the Detroit Lions in the Wild Card Round. The following week, Jordan was credited with his first career playoff start. He made six solo tackles and a pass deflection during a 35–32 Divisional Round loss at the San Francisco 49ers.

=== 2012 ===
Defensive coordinator Gregg Williams was not re-signed after the 2011 season and was replaced by former St. Louis Rams' head coach Steve Spagnuolo. Spagnuolo retained Jordan and Will Smith as the starting defensive ends to begin the regular season. Jordan started in the Saints' season-opener against the Washington Redskins and collected a season-high 11 combined tackles (six solo) in their 40–32 loss. In Week 9, Jordan made seven combined tackles and a season-high three sacks on quarterback Michael Vick during a 28–13 victory against the Philadelphia Eagles. Jordan also forced a fumble while sacking Michael Vick for a 12-yard loss on the Eagles' opening drive. Jordan started in all 16 games in 2012 and had a career-high 67 combined tackles (41 solo), three pass deflections, eight sacks, three forced fumbles, and two fumble recoveries. The Saints finished with a 7–9 record in 2012. Head coach Sean Payton was suspended for the entire season due to the New Orleans Saints bounty scandal.

=== 2013 ===
On January 24, 2013, the Saints fired defensive coordinator Steve Spagnuolo after the defense allowed an NFL record 7,042 total yards in 2012. Head coach Sean Payton also announced that the defense would transition to a base 3–4 defense. During the draft, NFL analyst Mike Mayock stated Jordan was better suited to play in a 3–4 defensive alignment. Defensive coordinator Rob Ryan named Jordan and Akiem Hicks the starting defensive ends to begin the regular season, alongside nose tackle Brodrick Bunkley.

On September 15, 2013, he collected a season-high six combined tackles and a sack in the Saints' 16–14 win at the Buccaneers. In Week 3, Jordan made four combined tackles and had two sacks on Cardinals' quarterback Carson Palmer during a 31–7 victory against the Arizona Cardinals. On November 21, 2013, Jordan tied his season-high of six combined tackles, had a season-high of 2.5 sacks, and deflected a pass in the Saints' 17–13 win at the Atlanta Falcons. On December 27, 2013, Jordan was selected to appear in the 2014 Pro Bowl, which became his first Pro Bowl selection. Jordan started in all 16 games in 2013 and made 47 combined tackles (29 solo), 12.5 sacks, four pass deflections, two forced fumbles, and two fumble recoveries.

The Saints finished second in the National Football Conference (NFC) South with an 11–5 record and earned a Wild Card berth. On January 4, 2014, Jordan made four combined tackles and had 1.5 sacks on quarterback Nick Foles in the Saints' 26–24 victory at the Eagles in the NFC Wild Card Round. The following week, he made six combined tackles and sacked Seahawks' quarterback Russell Wilson during a 23–15 loss at the Seattle Seahawks in the Divisional Round. He was ranked 99th by his fellow players on the NFL Top 100 Players of 2014.

=== 2014 ===
Head coach Sean Payton retained Jordan, Akiem Hicks, and Brodrick Bunkley as the starting defensive line in 2014. In Week 8, Jordan recorded three combined tackles and made a season-high two sacks on quarterback Aaron Rodgers during a 44–23 win against the Packers. On November 30, 2014, Jordan made a season-high six combined tackles, a pass deflection, a sack, and made his first career interception in the Saints' 35–32 victory at the Pittsburgh Steelers in Week 13. Jordan intercepted a pass by Steelers' quarterback Ben Roethlisberger, that was originally intended for wide receiver Markus Wheaton, and returned it for a six-yard gain in the third quarter. In Week 17, he collected a season-high six combined tackles and made 1.5 sacks on quarterback Josh McCown in the Saints' 23–20 victory at the Buccaneers. He started all 16 games in 2014 and finished with 51 combined tackles (32 solo), 7.5 sacks, five passes defensed, and an interception.

=== 2015 ===
On June 2, 2015, the Saints signed Jordan to a five-year, $55 million contract with $33.46 million guaranteed and a signing bonus of $15 million. His contract also includes $22.69 million guaranteed at signing, performance incentives, and a potential opt-out in 2019.

During training camp, the Saints switched their base defense to a 4–3 defense. Head coach Sean Payton also labeled Jordan a "Jack linebacker" in his defensive end role. Defensive coordinator Rob Ryan named Jordan and Akiem Hicks the starting defensive ends to start the 2015 regular season, along with defensive tackles John Jenkins and Kevin Williams. On November 16, 2015, the Saints fired defensive coordinator Rob Ryan and promoted defensive assistant Dennis Allen to defensive coordinator in his place. Ryan's defense allowed the fourth most points in 2014 and allowed an average of 31.5 points per a game in the Saints' first six games of 2015. On October 15, 2015, Jordan collected a season-high six combined tackles, forced a fumble, and made a season-high three sacks on quarterback Matt Ryan during a 31–21 victory against the Falcons in Week 6. The following week, he made two solo tackles and two sacks in the Saints' 27–21 win at the Indianapolis Colts in Week 7. Jordan started in 16 games in 2015 and finished the season with 45 combined tackles (32 solo), ten sacks, five pass deflections, two fumble recoveries, and a forced fumble.

On January 26, 2016, the Saints announced that Jordan had been selected to play in the 2016 Pro Bowl as an injury replacement for New England Patriots' defensive end Chandler Jones. He was ranked 99th on the NFL Top 100 Players of 2016 and was named a 2015 Pro Football Focus second-team All-Pro.

=== 2016 ===
Jordan retained his starting defensive end job along with a revamped defensive line that included, Paul Kruger and defensive tackles Tyeler Davison and Nick Fairley. In Week 10, Jordan collected a season-high nine combined tackles and a sack during a 25–23 loss to the Denver Broncos. He started in all 16 games and made 58 combined tackles (40 solo), 7.5 sacks, six pass deflections, and a forced fumble. Pro Football Focus gave Jordan an overall grade of 92.1 and ranked third among all edge rushers in 2016.

=== 2017 ===
Head coach Sean Payton named Jordan and Alex Okafor the starting defensive ends to begin the regular season, along with defensive tackles Tyeler Davison and Sheldon Rankins.

On September 11, 2017, Jordan made four combined tackles, a pass deflection, and a sack in the Saints' 29–19 loss at the Minnesota Vikings. His sack brought his career total to 47.5 sacks, which was enough to surpass Charles Grant as eighth in franchise history. On October 15, 2017, Jordan made four combined tackles, two sacks, and made an interception for his first career touchdown during a 52–38 win against the Lions in Week 6. Jordan intercepted a pass by quarterback Matthew Stafford, that was originally intended for tight end Eric Ebron, and scored a touchdown in the fourth quarter. His performance against the Lions earned him NFC Defensive Player of the Week. On November 5, 2017, he collected a season-high seven combined tackles and 1.5 sacks during a 30–10 win against the Buccaneers. He earned NFC Defensive Player of the Month for November. On December 19, 2017, Jordan was selected to the 2018 Pro Bowl, marking the third selection of his career. He started all 16 games and made 62 combined tackles (48 solo), a career-high 13 sacks, 11 pass deflections, two forced fumbles, an interception, and a touchdown. He was named to his third Pro Bowl. He earned First Team All-Pro honors for the first time. Jordan earned an overall grade of 96.2 from Pro Football Focus, which was the highest grade among all qualifying edge rushers in 2017. The Saints finished with a 11–5 record and won the NFC South. In the Wild Card Round against the Panthers, he had three combined tackles and two passes defensed in the 31–26 victory. In the Divisional Round loss to the Vikings, he had two combined tackles in the Minneapolis Miracle. He was ranked 26th by his fellow players on the NFL Top 100 Players of 2018.

=== 2018 ===
In Week 2 against the Browns, Jordan recorded his first two sacks of the season on Tyrod Taylor during the 21–18 win. In the following week's game against the Falcons, Jordan recorded another two sacks on Matt Ryan during the 43–37 overtime win. In Week 12 against the Falcons on Thanksgiving Day, Jordan recorded another two sacks on Matt Ryan during the 31–17 win. In Week 13 against the Dallas Cowboys on Thursday Night Football, Jordan recorded a season high 7 tackles and sacked Dak Prescott twice. Jordan's second sack of the game was a strip sack which he recovered also late in the fourth quarter. Despite Jordan's stellar play, the Saints would go on to lose the game by a score of 13–10. In the following week's game against the Buccaneers, Jordan sacked Jameis Winston twice during the 28–14 win. This was Jordan's third game in a row with two sacks. In the 2018 season, Jordan had 12 sacks, 49 total tackles, 21 quarterback hits, six passes defensed, and one forced fumble. He earned his fourth career Pro Bowl nomination.

The Saints finished with 13–3 record, won the division, and earned a first-round bye for the playoffs. In the Divisional Round win over the Eagles, Jordan recorded three combined tackles and one pass defensed during the 20–14 win. In the NFC Championship loss to the Los Angeles Rams, Jordan recorded three combined tackles and a quarterback hit during the 26–23 overtime loss. He was ranked 41st by his fellow players on the NFL Top 100 Players of 2019.

=== 2019 ===
On June 11, 2019, the Saints signed Jordan to a three-year, $52.5 million contract extension with $42 million guaranteed, keeping him under contract through the 2023 season. In Week 1 against the Houston Texans, Jordan recorded his first sack of the season on Deshaun Watson during the 30–28 win. In Week 2 against the Rams, Jordan sacked and forced a fumble on Jared Goff in the 27–9 loss. In the second quarter, Jordan forced a fumble off Goff and returned it for a touchdown. The referees initially ruled the play an incomplete pass. However, video replay revealed that Jordan forced a fumble, but his return for a touchdown did not count since the play had already been blown dead. After the game, Jordan was furious and referred the referees as "foot locker". In Week 6 against the Jacksonville Jaguars, Jordan sacked Gardner Minshew twice during the 13–6 win. A week later against the Chicago Bears, Jordan sacked Mitch Trubisky twice in the 36–25 win which was the Saints' sixth win of the season. In Week 13 against the Falcons on Thanksgiving Day, Jordan recorded a season high 6 tackles and sacked Matt Ryan 4 times in the 26–18 win. Jordan won the NFC Defensive Player of the Week award for his performance.

Jordan finished the season with 52 combined tackles (38 solo), a career high 15.5 sacks, one fumble recovery, and three pass deflections in 16 games started. In the Wild Card Round of the playoffs against the Vikings, Jordan recorded three tackles and sacked Kirk Cousins once during the 26–20 overtime loss. For his efforts in the 2019 season, Jordan earned his fifth career Pro Bowl nomination. He was ranked 23rd by his fellow players on the NFL Top 100 Players of 2020. He was named to the Pro Football Hall of Team All-Decade Team for the 2010s.

=== 2020 ===
In Week 11 against the Falcons, Jordan recorded three sacks on Matt Ryan during the 24–9 win. In Week 12 against the Broncos, Jordan recorded a sack on wide receiver Kendall Hinton during the 31–3 win. Jordan was named the NFC Defensive Player of the Month for his performance in November. In Week 15 against the Kansas City Chiefs, Jordan was ejected from the game after punching Chiefs' guard Andrew Wylie. He was named to the Pro Bowl for the sixth time. He was ranked 46th by his fellow players on the NFL Top 100 Players of 2021.

=== 2021 ===
In Week 15, Jordan had two sacks, five tackles, and a forced fumble in a 9–0 win over the Buccaneers, earning NFC Defensive Player of the Week. In Week 17, had eight tackles, 3.5 sacks, and three tackles for loss in a 18–10 win over the Panthers, earning his second NFC Defensive Player of the Week honor of the season. He was named to his seventh Pro Bowl for his efforts in the 2021 season. He was ranked 69th by his fellow players on the NFL Top 100 Players of 2022.

=== 2022 ===
On December 10, 2022, the NFL fined Cameron $50,000 for faking an injury in the Week 13 game against the Buccaneers. In Week 17, Jordan had three sacks, along with a forced fumble and five tackles, becoming the Saints all-time sack leader, surpassing Rickey Jackson, in a 20–10 win over the Eagles, earning NFC Defensive Player of the Week. He was named as a Pro Bowler for the 2022 season. He was ranked 50th by his fellow players on the NFL Top 100 Players of 2023.

=== 2023 ===
On August 4, 2023, the Saints signed Jordan to a two-year contract extension with $27.5 million guaranteed, keeping him under contract through the 2025 season. In the 2023 season, Jordan started in all 17 games. He finished with two sacks, 43 total tackles (20 solo), three passes defended, and one fumble recovery.

=== 2024 ===
Jordan finished the 2024 season with four sacks, 34 tackles, one interception, and four passes defended. After the 2024 season, he was named the 2025 Bart Starr Award winner for his contributions on and off the field.

=== 2025 ===
Jordan finished the 2025 season with 10.5 sacks, 47 total tackles (32 solo), two passes defended, and two forced fumbles.

=== 2026 ===
On June 16, 2026, Jordan signed a one-year contract to remain with the New Orleans Saints.

== Career statistics ==
Legend
	Led the league
**Bold**	Career high

=== NFL ===
==== Regular season ====
Year	Team	Games		Tackles					Fumbles			Interceptions					
Year	Team	GP	GS	Cmb	Solo	Ast	Sck	TFL	FF	FR	Yds	Int	Yds	Avg	Lng	TD	PD
2011	NO	16	15	31	18	13	1.0	2	0	1	0	0	0	0.0	0	0	4
2012	NO	16	16	**67**	41	**26**	8.0	8	**3**	**2**	0	0	0	0.0	0	0	3
2013	NO	16	16	47	29	18	12.5	13	2	**2**	**11**	0	0	0.0	0	0	4
2014	NO	16	16	51	32	19	7.5	8	0	1	0	**1**	**6**	**6.0**	**6**	0	5
2015	NO	16	16	45	32	13	10.0	15	1	**2**	0	0	0	0.0	0	0	5
2016	NO	16	16	58	40	18	7.5	17	1	0	0	0	0	0.0	0	0	6
2017	NO	16	16	62	**48**	14	13.0	17	2	0	0	**1**	0	0.0	0	**1**	**11**
2018	NO	16	16	49	35	14	12.0	**18**	1	1	0	0	0	0.0	0	0	6
2019	NO	16	16	53	37	16	**15.5**	15	0	1	0	0	0	0.0	0	0	3
2020	NO	16	16	51	34	17	7.5	11	1	0	0	0	0	0.0	0	0	3
2021	NO	16	16	59	38	21	12.5	13	2	0	0	0	0	0.0	0	0	6
2022	NO	16	16	66	40	**26**	8.5	13	2	0	0	0	0	0.0	0	0	2
2023	NO	17	17	43	20	23	2.0	3	0	1	0	0	0	0.0	0	0	3
2024	NO	17	17	34	18	16	4.0	7	0	0	0	**1**	0	0.0	0	0	4
2025	NO	17	17	47	32	15	10.5	15	2	1	0	0	0	0.0	0	0	2
2026	NO	9	1	15	7	8	0.0	2	0	0	0	0	0	0.0	0	0	0
Career		252	243	778	501	277	132.0	177	17	12	11	3	6	2.0	6	1	67

==== Postseason ====
Year	Team	Games		Tackles					Fumbles			Interceptions					
Year	Team	GP	GS	Cmb	Solo	Ast	Sck	TFL	FF	FR	Yds	Int	Yds	Avg	Lng	TD	PD
2011	NO	2	1	7	6	1	0.0	1	0	0	0	0	0	0.0	0	0	1
2013	NO	2	2	**10**	7	**3**	**2.5**	**4**	0	0	0	0	0	0.0	0	0	0
2017	NO	2	2	4	2	2	1.0	1	0	0	0	0	0	0.0	0	0	**2**
2018	NO	2	2	6	4	2	1.0	1	0	0	0	0	0	0.0	0	0	1
2019	NO	1	1	3	3	0	1.0	1	0	0	0	0	0	0.0	0	0	0
2020	NO	2	2	9	**8**	1	0.0	0	0	0	0	0	0	0.0	0	0	0
Career		11	10	39	30	9	5.5	8	0	0	0	0	0	0.0	0	0	4

=== College ===
Year	School	Conf	Class	Pos	G	Tackles					Interceptions					Fumbles			
Year	School	Conf	Class	Pos	G	**Solo**	**Ast**	**Tot**	**Loss**	**Sk**	**Int**	**Yds**	**Avg**	**TD**	**PD**	**FR**	**Yds**	**TD**	**FF**
2007	California	Pac-10	FR	DL	13	7	11	18	1.0	1.0	0	0	0	0	0	0	13	**1**	0
2008	California	Pac-10	SO	DL	12	26	21	47	11.0	4.0	**1**	**3**	**3.0**	0	0	0	0	0	0
2009	California	Pac-10	JR	DL	13	22	26	48	9.5	**6.0**	0	0	0	0	1	0	0	0	0
2010	California	Pac-10	SR	DL	12	**33**	**29**	**62**	**12.5**	5.5	0	0	0	0	**4**	**1**	**21**	**1**	**3**
**Career**	**California**				**50**	**88**	**87**	**175**	**34.0**	**16.5**	**1**	**3**	**3.0**	**0**	**5**	**1**	**34**	**2**	**3**

== Career highlights ==
NFL

- First-team All-Pro (2017)
- 2× Second-team All-Pro (2018, 2019)
- 8× Pro Bowl (2013, 2015, 2017–2022)
- NFL 2010s All-Decade Team
- Bart Starr Award (2025)
- 100 sacks club
- Ranked No. 100 in the Top 100 Players of 2026
- Ranked No. 99 in the Top 100 Players of 2014
- Ranked No. 99 in the Top 100 Players of 2016
- Ranked No. 26 in the Top 100 Players of 2018
- Ranked No. 41 in the Top 100 Players of 2019
- Ranked No. 23 in the Top 100 Players of 2020
- Ranked No. 46 in the Top 100 Players of 2021
- Ranked No. 69 in the Top 100 Players of 2022
- Ranked No. 50 in the Top 100 Players of 2023
- 2× NFC Defensive Player of the Month (Nov. 2017, Nov. 2020)

College

- First-team All-Pac-10 (2010)

New Orleans Saints records

- Sacks, career: 132

== Personal life ==
Jordan is a Christian. Jordan is married to Nikki Jordan. They have four children.

Jordan's father, Steve, was a tight end and played 13 years in the NFL with the Minnesota Vikings. His sister is married to Kasim Edebali.

In 2017, Jordan went on a USO tour to visit with American soldiers at bases in the Middle East and southwest Asia.
