= Toben Opurum =

American football player (born 1990)

No. 45
- Position: Fullback

Personal information
- Born: November 18, 1990 (age 35); Richardson, Texas, U.S.
- Listed height: 6 ft 1 in (1.85 m)
- Listed weight: 250 lb (113 kg)

Career information
- High school: Plano East (Plano, Texas)
- College: Kansas
- NFL draft: 2013: undrafted

Career history
- Kansas City Chiefs (2013)*; Houston Texans (2013–2014); New Orleans Saints (2014–2015); Denver Broncos (2016)*
- * Offseason or practice squad member only
- Stats at Pro Football Reference

Toben Opurum (born November 18, 1990) is an American former professional football fullback who played for the New Orleans Saints of the National Football League (NFL). Opurum played college football at the University of Kansas. Opurum was signed as an undrafted free agent by the Kansas City Chiefs.

== College career ==
Opurum was recruited as a running back by Kansas. As a freshman, Opurum rushed for 554 yards and 9 touchdowns.

Opurum began playing linebacker his sophomore year. His sophomore year, he recorded 21 tackles and 1 sack. Following his sophomore year, he was named Academic All Big-12.

As a junior, Opurum recorded 45 tackles and 4 sacks. His performance his junior year earned Opurum an honorable mention on the All Big-12 team that season.

His senior year, Opurum recorded 41 tackles and 1 and a half sacks.

== Professional career ==
=== Kansas City Chiefs ===
After going undrafted, Opurum signed with the Kansas City Chiefs on May 17, 2013. He played fullback during the Kansas City Chiefs' 2013 preseason, but was released during the Kansas City Chiefs' final cuts. He was then signed to the Kansas City Chiefs' practice squad. He was cut and re-signed to the practice squad several times during the 2013 season.

=== Houston Texans ===
On December 24, 2013, Opurum was signed by the Houston Texans off the Kansas City Chiefs' practice squad. Opurum was released during the final round of cuts of the 2014 preseason, but was signed to the practice squad after clearing waivers. He was released on October 7, 2014.

=== New Orleans Saints ===
The New Orleans Saints signed Opurum to their practice squad on December 11, 2014.

He was waived for final roster cuts before the start of the 2015 season, but was signed to the practice squad on September 6, 2015. On December 16, 2015, Opurum was promoted to the 53-man roster. He was waived on December 25, 2015, Opurum was waived by the Saints. He was promoted back to the active roster on January 3, 2016.

On May 9, 2016, Opurum was released by the Saints.

=== Denver Broncos ===
On May 10, 2016, Opurum was claimed via waivers by the Denver Broncos, but was waived two days later after a failed physical.
