= Ben Grubbs =

American football player (born 1984)

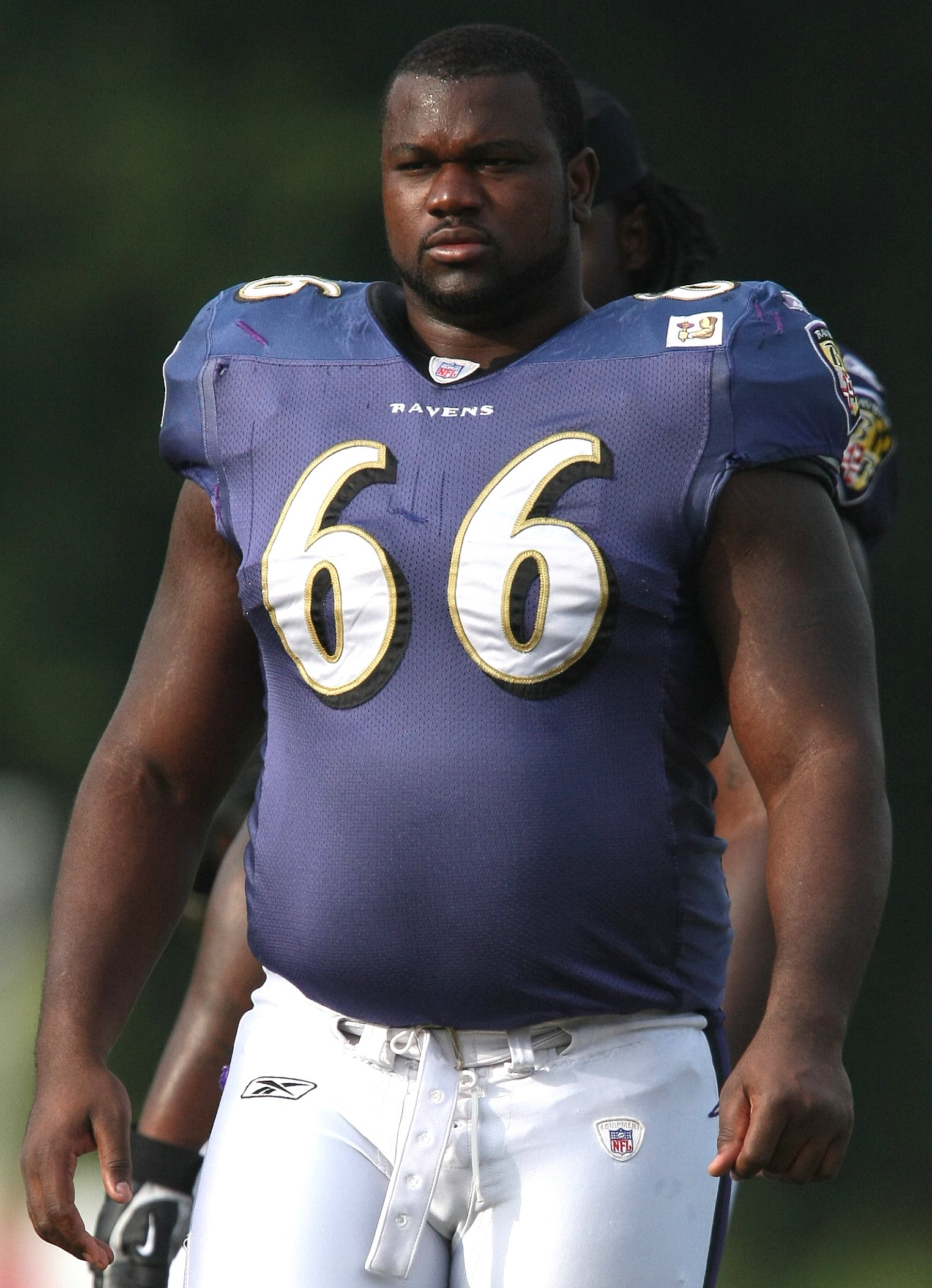
- Grubbs with the Baltimore Ravens in 2009

No. 66
- Position: Offensive guard

Personal information
- Born: March 10, 1984 (age 42); Columbus, Georgia, U.S.
- Listed height: 6 ft 3 in (1.91 m)
- Listed weight: 310 lb (141 kg)

Career information
- High school: Elmore County (Eclectic, Alabama)
- College: Auburn (2002–2006)
- NFL draft: 2007: 1st round, 29th overall pick

Career history
- Baltimore Ravens (2007–2011); New Orleans Saints (2012–2014); Kansas City Chiefs (2015)

Awards and highlights
- 2× Pro Bowl (2011, 2013); PFWA All-Rookie Team (2007); Second-team All-American (2006); First-team All-SEC (2006)

Career NFL statistics
- Games played: 129
- Games started: 125
- Stats at Pro Football Reference

Benjamin Richard Grubbs (born March 10, 1984) is an American former professional football player who was a guard in the National Football League (NFL). He played college football for the Auburn Tigers, and was selected by the Baltimore Ravens in the first round of the 2007 NFL draft. He also played for the New Orleans Saints and Kansas City Chiefs.

== Early life ==
Grubbs was born in Columbus, Georgia. He was raised in Eclectic, Alabama and attended Elmore County High School where he was the team's star linebacker. Grubbs registered 150 tackles, six sacks, and an interception as a senior. A two-way star, Grubbs also played fullback, rushing for 130 yards on 28 carries, with two touchdowns. He also caught seven passes for 50 yards. As a junior, Grubbs managed 110 total tackles, and an interception, also lettering as a four-year starter on the basketball team.

As a senior, he was rated one of the top 10 players in Alabama by SuperPrep Magazine. Grubbs was a SuperPrep All-American and an Alabama Sports Writer's Class 4A All-State selection as a linebacker. At 6-4, 250 as a high school senior, he was recruited as a defensive end, though. Considered a four-star recruit by Rivals.com, Grubbs was listed as the No. 23 strongside defensive end prospect in the nation. He verbally committed to Auburn on January 23, 2002, picking the Tigers over LSU and Alabama.

== College career ==
Grubbs began attending at Auburn University in 2002 after being encouraged to attend by his cousin, Alvin Leonard, as an oversized linebacker or undersized defensive end. He was redshirted for the 2002 football season, while he worked with the team's strength and conditioning coach to build muscle. Grubbs was slated to work with as a defensive tackle the following year.

Grubbs moved from defensive tackle to tight end during the 2003 season, playing in a total of nine games, including the last seven. During spring drills the following year, Grubbs moved from tight end to offensive guard, under the recommendation of his position coach Hugh Nall.

Grubbs started all 13 games during the Auburn Tiger's undefeated 2004 campaign.

In 2005, he started all 12 games for the Auburn Tigers.

During his career at Auburn University, Grubbs never missed a game and started 37 straight contests. During his Auburn career he blocked for future NFL running backs Cadillac Williams, Ronnie Brown, Kenny Irons, and quarterback Jason Campbell. He also starred alongside future left tackle for the San Diego Chargers, Marcus McNeill.

Grubbs completed his degree from Auburn, graduating with a Bachelor's in Public Administration in May 2006.

== Professional career ==
Pre-draft measurables
Height	Weight	Arm length	Hand span	40-yard dash	10-yard split	20-yard split	20-yard shuttle	Three-cone drill	Vertical jump	Broad jump	Bench press
6 ft 2 3/4 in (1.90 m)	311 lb (141 kg)	33 1/2 in (0.85 m)	10 1/4 in (0.26 m)	5.10 s	1.65 s	2.95 s	4.72 s	7.70 s	26.5 in (0.67 m)	8 ft 7 in (2.62 m)	35 reps
All values from NFL Combine/Pro Day

=== Baltimore Ravens ===
Grubbs was selected by the Baltimore Ravens in the first round with the 29th overall pick in the 2007 NFL draft. During his five years with the Ravens, he started 70 of 74 games and made one Pro Bowl.

=== New Orleans Saints ===
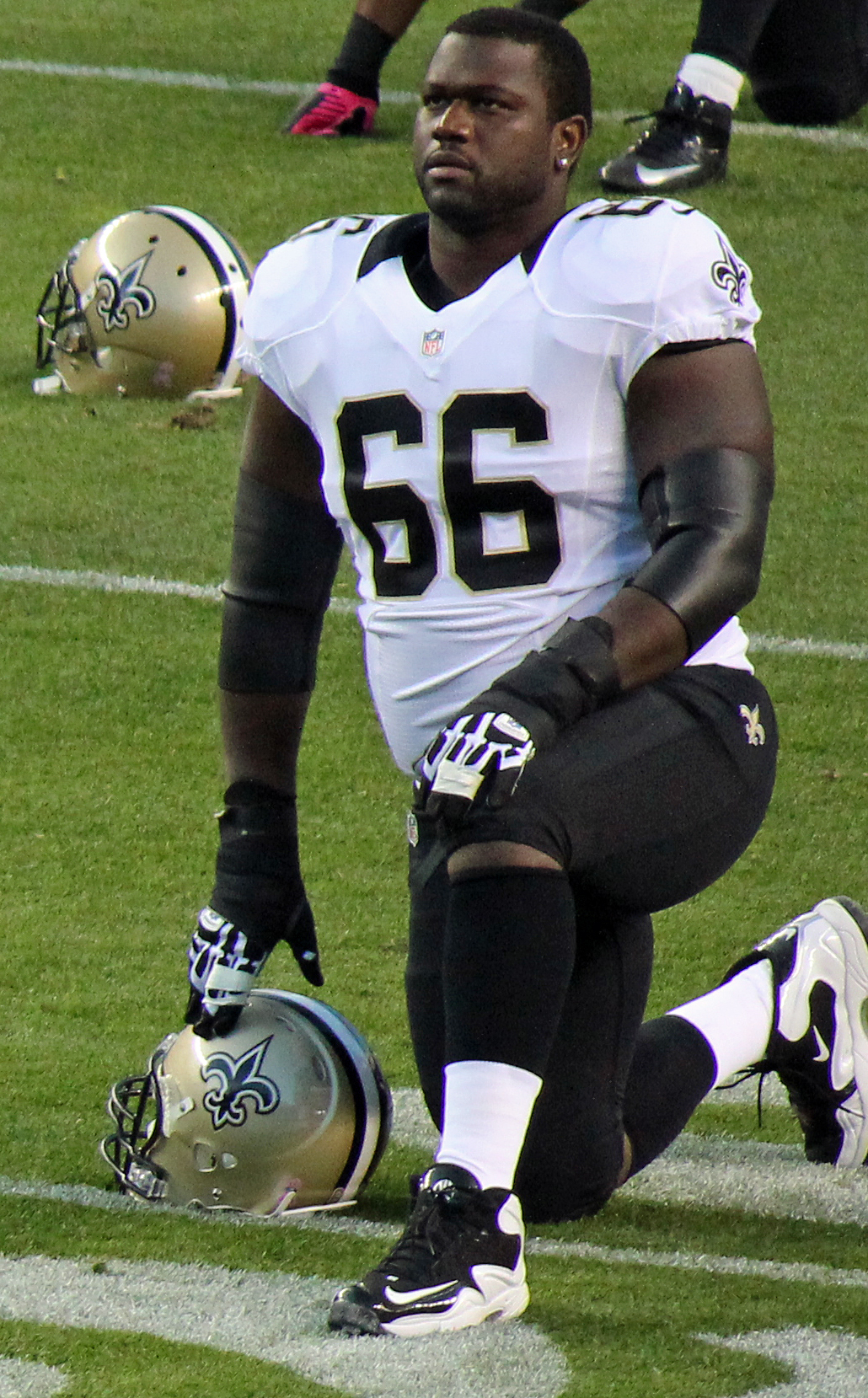
Grubbs in 2012

Grubbs signed a five-year, $36 million contract with the New Orleans Saints on March 15, 2012. During his time with the Saints, he made one Pro Bowl.

=== Kansas City Chiefs ===
On March 12, 2015, Grubbs was traded to the Kansas City Chiefs in exchange for a 5th round draft pick in the 2015 NFL draft (Tyeler Davison). On December 2, 2015, the Chiefs placed Grubbs on injured reserve. In his first season with the Chiefs, Grubbs started all 7 games he played in prior to being injured. At the end of the season, the Chiefs released him.
