= Austin Brown (American football) =

American football player (born 2003)

Profile
- Position: Safety

Personal information
- Born: October 22, 2003 (age 23)
- Listed height: 6 ft 1 in (1.85 m)
- Listed weight: 215 lb (98 kg)

Career information
- High school: Johnston City (Johnston City, Illinois)
- College: Wisconsin (2022–2025)
- NFL draft: 2026: undrafted

Career history
- Indianapolis Colts (2026)*
- * Offseason or practice squad member only
- Stats at Pro Football Reference

Austin Brown (born October 22, 2003) is an American professional football safety. He played college football for the Wisconsin Badgers.

== Early life ==
Brown attended Johnston City High School in Johnston City, Illinois, and committed to play college football for the Wisconsin Badgers.

== College career ==
Brown entered his true freshman season, competing for playing time and defensive snaps. That season, he played in 13 games, making just two tackles. In the 2023 season, Brown racked up 37 tackles and a sack. During the 2024 season, he totaled 51 tackles as a starter. In the 2025 season opener, Brown had a fumble recovery in a victory over Western Michigan. In week 3, he tallied 11 tackles in a loss against Alabama. Brown started all 12 games on the season, posting 52 tackles with one going for a loss, and three pass deflections.

== Professional career ==
Pre-draft measurables
Height	Weight	Arm length	Hand span	Wingspan	40-yard dash	10-yard split	20-yard split	20-yard shuttle	Three-cone drill	Vertical jump	Broad jump	Bench press
5 ft 11 3/4 in (1.82 m)	199 lb (90 kg)	31 1/8 in (0.79 m)	9 1/4 in (0.23 m)	6 ft 3 7/8 in (1.93 m)	4.51 s	1.61 s	2.65 s	4.21 s	7.05 s	43.0 in (1.09 m)	10 ft 9 in (3.28 m)	20 reps
All values from Pro Day

After not being selected in the 2026 NFL draft, Brown signed with the Indianapolis Colts as an undrafted free agent. On August 30, he was waived by Indianapolis as a part of final roster cuts.
