= Tyeler Davison =

American football player (born 1992)

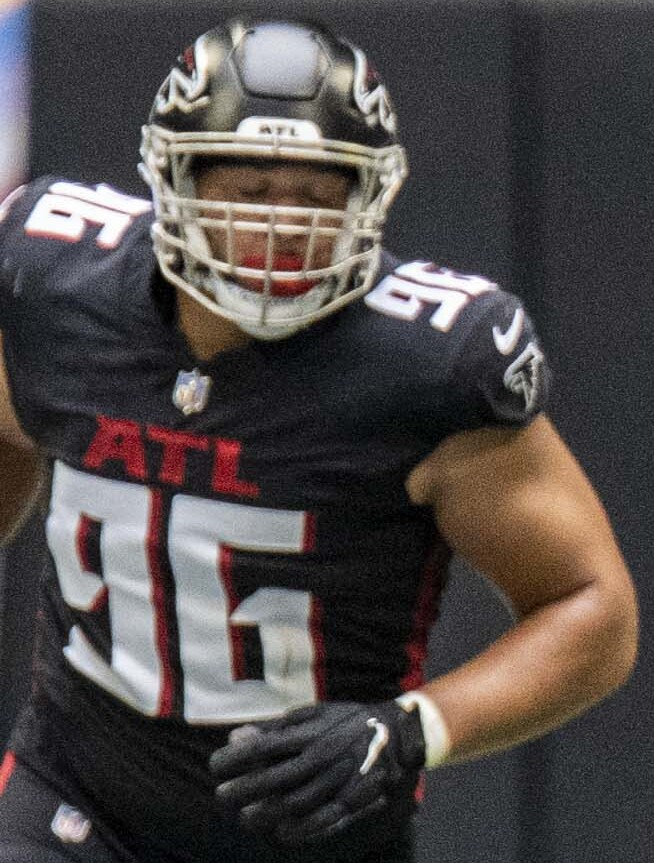
- Davison in 2021

No. 95, 96, 90
- Position: Nose tackle

Personal information
- Born: September 23, 1992 (age 34); Phoenix, Arizona, U.S.
- Listed height: 6 ft 2 in (1.88 m)
- Listed weight: 309 lb (140 kg)

Career information
- High school: Desert Mountain (Scottsdale, Arizona)
- College: Fresno State
- NFL draft: 2015: 5th round, 154th overall pick

Career history
- New Orleans Saints (2015–2018); Atlanta Falcons (2019–2021); Cleveland Browns (2022); Los Angeles Chargers (2022)

Awards and highlights
- First-team All-MWC (2014)

Career NFL statistics
- Total Tackles: 217
- Sacks: 5
- Forced fumbles: 3
- Fumble recoveries: 1
- Pass deflections: 4
- Stats at Pro Football Reference

Tyeler Davison (born September 23, 1992) is an American former professional football player who was a nose tackle in the National Football League (NFL). He played college football for the Fresno State Bulldogs. He was selected by the New Orleans Saints in the fifth round of the 2015 NFL draft.

== Early life ==
Davison attended Washington High School his freshman year where he played freshman football as well as games on the varsity football team. He was also on the Rams wrestling team. After his freshman year he moved to Scottsdale, Arizona, where he attended Desert Mountain High School. He lettered in wrestling and football his sophomore, junior and senior year.

He was considered a two-star recruit by Rivals.com.

== Professional career ==
Pre-draft measurables
Height	Weight	Arm length	Hand span	40-yard dash	10-yard split	20-yard split	20-yard shuttle	Three-cone drill	Vertical jump	Broad jump	Bench press
6 ft 1 5/8 in (1.87 m)	316 lb (143 kg)	34 in (0.86 m)	10 3/4 in (0.27 m)	5.16 s	1.75 s	2.94 s	4.46 s	7.53 s	33.0 in (0.84 m)	8 ft 9 in (2.67 m)	32 reps
All values from NFL Combine/Pro Day

=== New Orleans Saints ===
Davison was selected by the New Orleans Saints in the fifth round, 154th overall in the 2015 NFL draft. The pick used to select him was acquired from the Kansas City Chiefs in a trade that sent Ben Grubbs to Kansas City. Davison finished his rookie season with 18 tackles and 1.5 sacks.

=== Atlanta Falcons ===
On April 13, 2019, Davison signed a one-year contract with the Atlanta Falcons. He played in all 16 games with 12 starts, recording a career-high 55 tackles and one sack.

On March 17, 2020, Davison signed a three-year, $12 million contract extension with the Falcons. He was placed on the reserve/COVID-19 list by the team on July 31, 2020, and was activated five days later. He was released on March 15, 2022.

=== Cleveland Browns ===
On October 11, 2022, Davison was signed to the practice squad of the Cleveland Browns.

=== Los Angeles Chargers ===
On November 16, 2022, Davison was signed by the Los Angeles Chargers off the Browns practice squad.

== NFL career statistics ==
Legend
**Bold**	Career high

=== Regular season ===
Year	Team	Games		Tackles					Interceptions					Fumbles			
Year	Team	GP	GS	Cmb	Solo	Ast	Sck	TFL	Int	Yds	TD	Lng	PD	FF	FR	Yds	TD
2015	NOR	**16**	5	18	10	8	1.5	**4**	0	0	0	0	0	0	0	0	0
2016	NOR	15	15	23	9	14	0.0	0	0	0	0	0	**2**	0	0	0	0
2017	NOR	**16**	**16**	31	22	9	0.0	3	0	0	0	0	1	**2**	0	0	0
2018	NOR	14	12	23	8	15	**2.0**	2	0	0	0	0	1	1	0	0	0
2019	ATL	**16**	12	**55**	**26**	**29**	1.0	**4**	0	0	0	0	0	0	**1**	0	0
2020	ATL	**16**	15	36	15	21	0.5	2	0	0	0	0	0	0	0	0	0
2021	ATL	12	11	30	10	20	0.0	3	0	0	0	0	0	0	0	0	0
2022	LAC	6	0	1	1	0	0.0	0	0	0	0	0	0	0	0	0	0
		111	86	217	101	116	5.0	18	0	0	0	0	4	3	1	0	0

=== Playoffs ===
Year	Team	Games		Tackles					Interceptions					Fumbles			
Year	Team	GP	GS	Cmb	Solo	Ast	Sck	TFL	Int	Yds	TD	Lng	PD	FF	FR	Yds	TD
2017	NOR	**2**	**2**	**9**	1	**8**	**1.0**	**1**	0	0	0	0	0	0	0	0	0
2018	NOR	**2**	**2**	6	**3**	3	0.0	0	0	0	0	0	0	0	0	0	0
		4	4	15	4	11	1.0	1	0	0	0	0	0	0	0	0	0
