= Elmore County High School =

High school in Alabama, United States

Coordinates: 32°38′02″N 86°01′46″W

Information
- Website: echs.elmoreco.com

== History ==
Elmore County High School is a public high school in Eclectic, Alabama. It is a part of the Elmore County Public School System.

In 2006, as part of renovations, the school was to receive a new band room.

In 2007 the Burt-Haynie Stadium at the school was to be renovated.
