= Eclectic, Alabama =

- Town
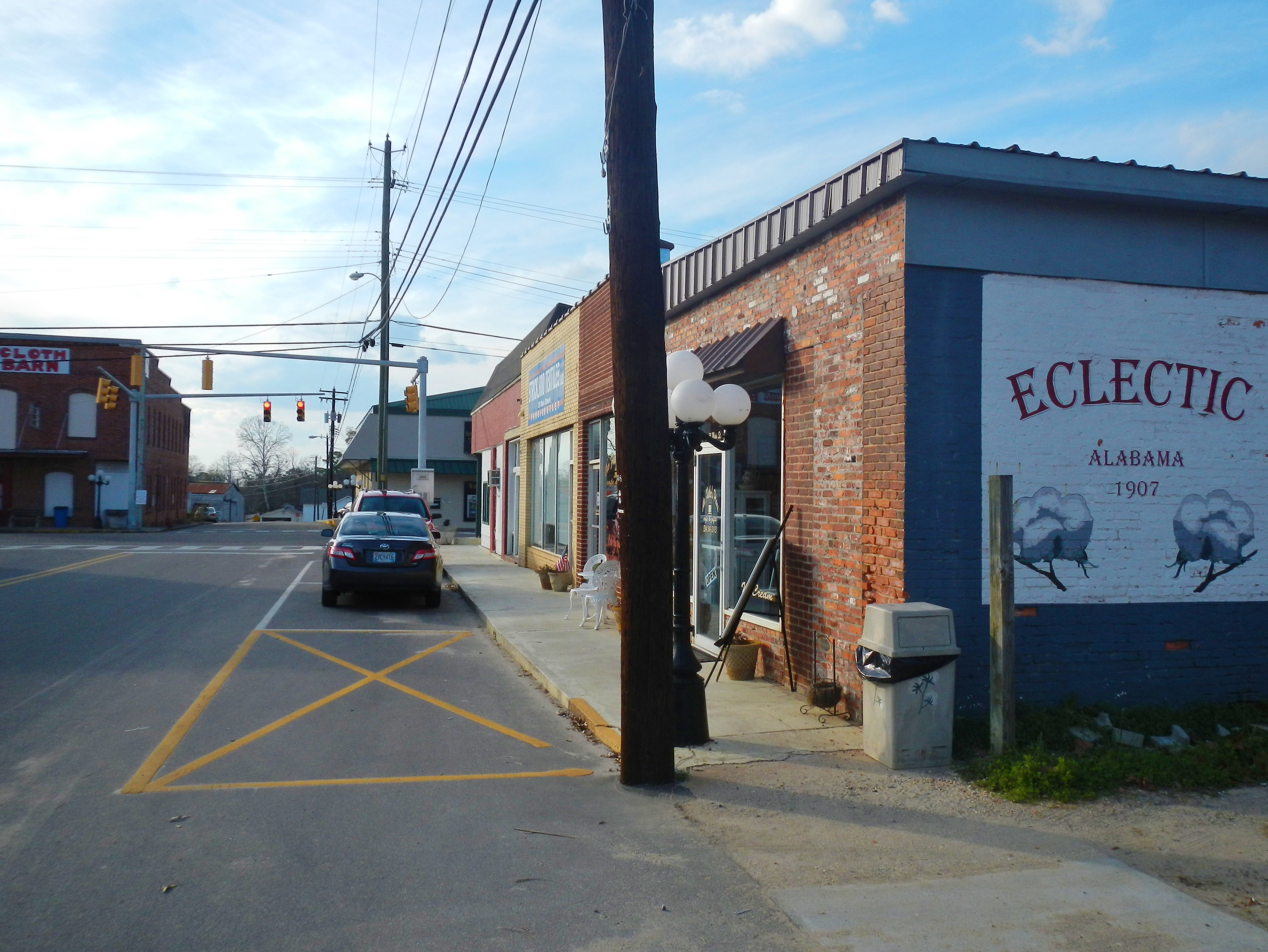
- Downtown Eclectic

- Flag

- Location of Eclectic in Elmore County, Alabama
- Coordinates: 32°37′48″N 86°02′19″W
- Country: United States
- State: Alabama
- County: Elmore

Area
  - Total: 4.19 sq mi (10.85 km^{2})
  - Land: 4.11 sq mi (10.65 km^{2})
  - Water: 0.077 sq mi (0.20 km^{2})
- Elevation: 528 ft (161 m)

Population (2020)
  - Total: 1,193
  - Density: 290.1/sq mi (112.01/km^{2})
- Time zone: UTC-6 (Central (CST))
  - Summer (DST): UTC-5 (CDT)
- ZIP code: 36024
- Area code: 334
- FIPS code: 01-22816
- GNIS feature ID: 2406420
- Website: http://www.townofeclectic.com

Eclectic is a town in Elmore County, Alabama, United States. It incorporated in 1907. At the 2020 census, the population was 1,193. It is part of the Montgomery Metropolitan Statistical Area.

== History ==
Eclectic was founded by Dr. M. L. Fielder, a practitioner of eclectic medicine, hence the name. It has been noted on lists of unusual place names.

The first post office in Eclectic was established in 1879.

== Geography ==
The town is located along Alabama State Route 63, which runs from south to north through the center of town, leading northeast 26 mi (42 km) to Alexander City and southwest 5 mi (8.0 km) to the unincorporated community of Claud. Alabama State Route 170 connects the town to Wetumpka, the Elmore County seat, 15 mi (24 km) to the southwest.

According to the U.S. Census Bureau, the town has a total area of 4.3 square miles (11 km^{2}), of which 4.2 square miles (11 km^{2}) is land and 0.1 square miles (0.26 km^{2}) (1.17%) is water.

== Demographics ==
Historical population
Census	Pop.	Note	%±
1910	315		—
1920	555		76.2%
1930	678		22.2%
1940	606		−10.6%
1950	715		18.0%
1960	926		29.5%
1970	1,184		27.9%
1980	1,124		−5.1%
1990	1,087		−3.3%
2000	1,037		−4.6%
2010	1,001		−3.5%
2020	1,193		19.2%
U.S. Decennial Census; 2013 Estimate

=== Racial and ethnic composition ===
Eclectic town, Alabama – Racial and ethnic composition Note: the US Census treats Hispanic/Latino as an ethnic category. This table excludes Latinos from the racial categories and assigns them to a separate category. Hispanics/Latinos may be of any race. Race and ethnicity was not surveyed for populations under 2,500 in the 1980 census and under 1,000 in 1990 census.
Race / Ethnicity (NH = Non-Hispanic)	Pop 1990	Pop 2000	Pop 2010	Pop 2020	% 1990	% 2000	% 2010	% 2020
White alone (NH)	841	802	853	910	77.37%	77.34%	85.21%	76.28%
Black or African American alone (NH)	235	193	109	189	21.62%	18.61%	10.89%	15.84%
Native American or Alaska Native alone (NH)	4	10	4	1	0.37%	0.96%	0.40%	0.08%
Asian alone (NH)	1	1	0	6	0.09%	0.10%	0.00%	0.50%
Native Hawaiian or Pacific Islander alone (NH)	x	0	1	0	x	0.00%	0.10%	0.00%
Other race alone (NH)	0	4	0	4	0.00%	0.39%	0.00%	0.34%
Mixed race or Multiracial (NH)	x	8	21	61	x	0.77%	2.10%	5.11%
Hispanic or Latino (any race)	6	19	13	22	0.55%	1.83%	1.30%	1.84%
Total	1,087	1,037	1,001	1,193	100.00%	100.00%	100.00%	100.00%

=== 2020 census ===
As of the 2020 census, there were 1,193 people, 446 households, and 330 families residing in the town. The median age was 39.6 years. 26.1% of residents were under the age of 18 and 16.3% were 65 years of age or older. For every 100 females, there were 85.5 males, and for every 100 females age 18 and over, there were 80.4 males.

0.0% of residents lived in urban areas, while 100.0% lived in rural areas.

Among households in Eclectic, 35.4% had children under the age of 18 living in them. Of all households, 45.4% were married-couple households, 18.1% were households with a male householder and no spouse or partner present, and 33.3% were households with a female householder and no spouse or partner present. About 28.3% of all households were made up of individuals, and 13.6% had someone living alone who was 65 years of age or older.

There were 520 housing units, of which 9.8% were vacant. The homeowner vacancy rate was 2.5% and the rental vacancy rate was 9.1%.

=== 2010 census ===
At the 2010 census there were 1,001 people, 399 households, and 266 families living in the town. The population density was 238.3 inhabitants per square mile (92.0/km^{2}). There were 438 housing units at an average density of 104.3 per square mile (40.3/km^{2}). The racial makeup of the town was 86.4% White, 11.0% Black or African American, 0.4% Native American, 0.0% Asian, 0.0% from other races, and 2.1% from two or more races. 1.3% of the population were Hispanic or Latino of any race. Of the 399 households 29.8% had children under the age of 18 living with them, 50.4% were married couples living together, 14.0% had a female householder with no husband present, and 33.3% were non-families. 29.6% of households were one person and 15.0% were one person aged 65 or older. The average household size was 2.51 and the average family size was 3.14.

The age distribution was 25.5% under the age of 18, 8.1% from 18 to 24, 23.0% from 25 to 44, 25.9% from 45 to 64, and 17.6% 65 or older. The median age was 39.9 years. For every 100 females, there were 82.3 males. For every 100 females age 18 and over, there were 79.8 males.

The median household income was $34,750 and the median family income was $42,188. Males had a median income of $35,815 versus $27,684 for females. The per capita income for the town was $19,181. About 8.6% of families and 13.1% of the population were below the poverty line, including 22.4% of those under age 18 and 5.7% of those age 65 or over.

=== 2000 census ===
At the 2000 census there were 1,037 people, 409 households, and 280 families living in the town. The population density was 244.7 inhabitants per square mile (94.5/km^{2}). There were 459 housing units at an average density of 108.3 per square mile (41.8/km^{2}). The racial makeup of the town was 78.11% White, 19.19% Black or African American, 0.96% Native American, 0.10% Asian, 0.87% from other races, and 0.77% from two or more races. 1.83% of the population were Hispanic or Latino of any race. Of the 409 households 33.3% had children under the age of 18 living with them, 45.7% were married couples living together, 16.9% had a female householder with no husband present, and 31.3% were non-families. 29.1% of households were one person and 14.7% were one person aged 65 or older. The average household size was 2.54 and the average family size was 3.14.

The age distribution was 30.1% under the age of 18, 6.4% from 18 to 24, 28.4% from 25 to 44, 19.0% from 45 to 64, and 16.1% 65 or older. The median age was 36 years. For every 100 females, there were 85.2 males. For every 100 females age 18 and over, there were 79.9 males.

The median household income was $30,906 and the median family income was $31,855. Males had a median income of $29,554 versus $18,162 for females. The per capita income for the town was $14,131. About 20.5% of families and 25.5% of the population were below the poverty line, including 32.6% of those under age 18 and 23.4% of those age 65 or over.

== Education ==
It is in the Elmore County Public School System.

== Notable people ==
- Ben Grubbs, former offensive guard for Auburn University
- Ludd M. Spivey, president of Florida Southern College from 1925 to 1957

== Gallery ==
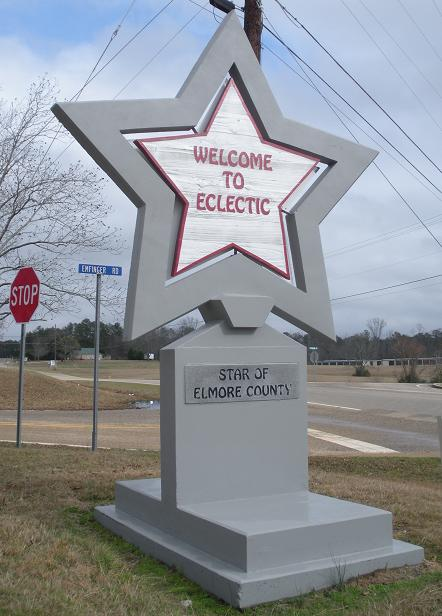
Eclectic's welcome sign

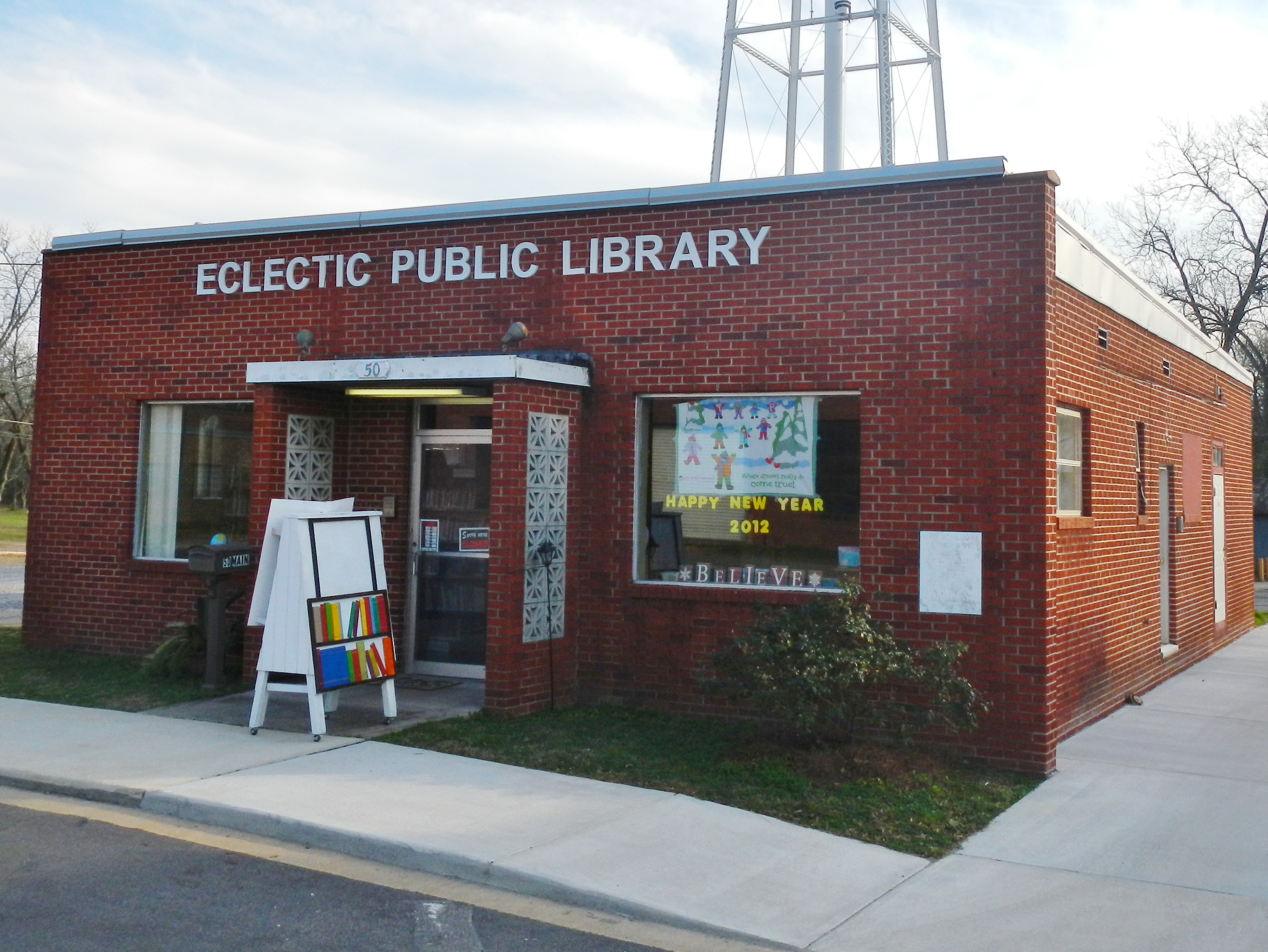
Eclectic Public Library

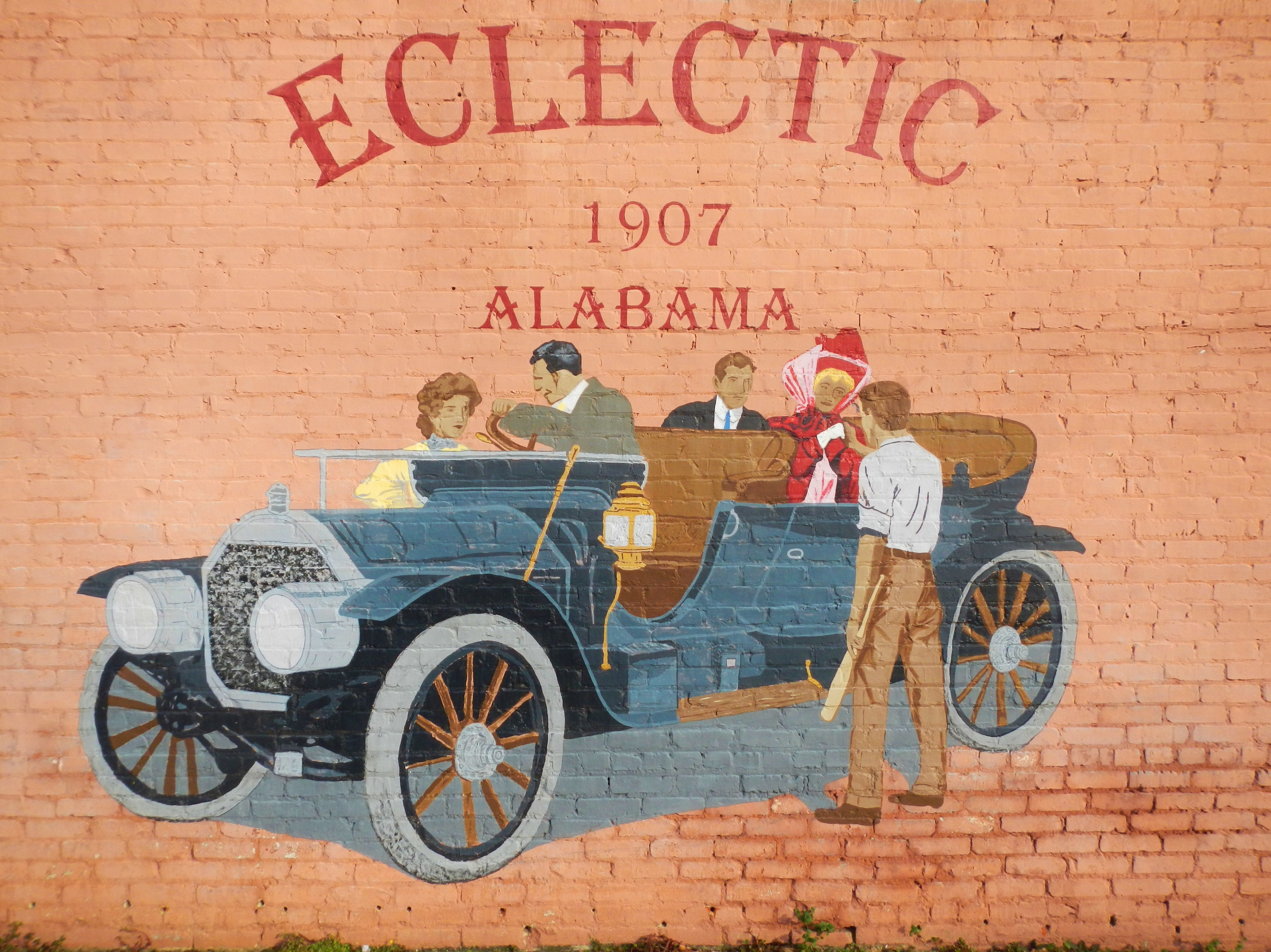
A mural in downtown Eclectic
