= Pula =

City in Istria County, Croatia

Pula Pola
- City
- Grad Pula; City of Pula / Città di Pola
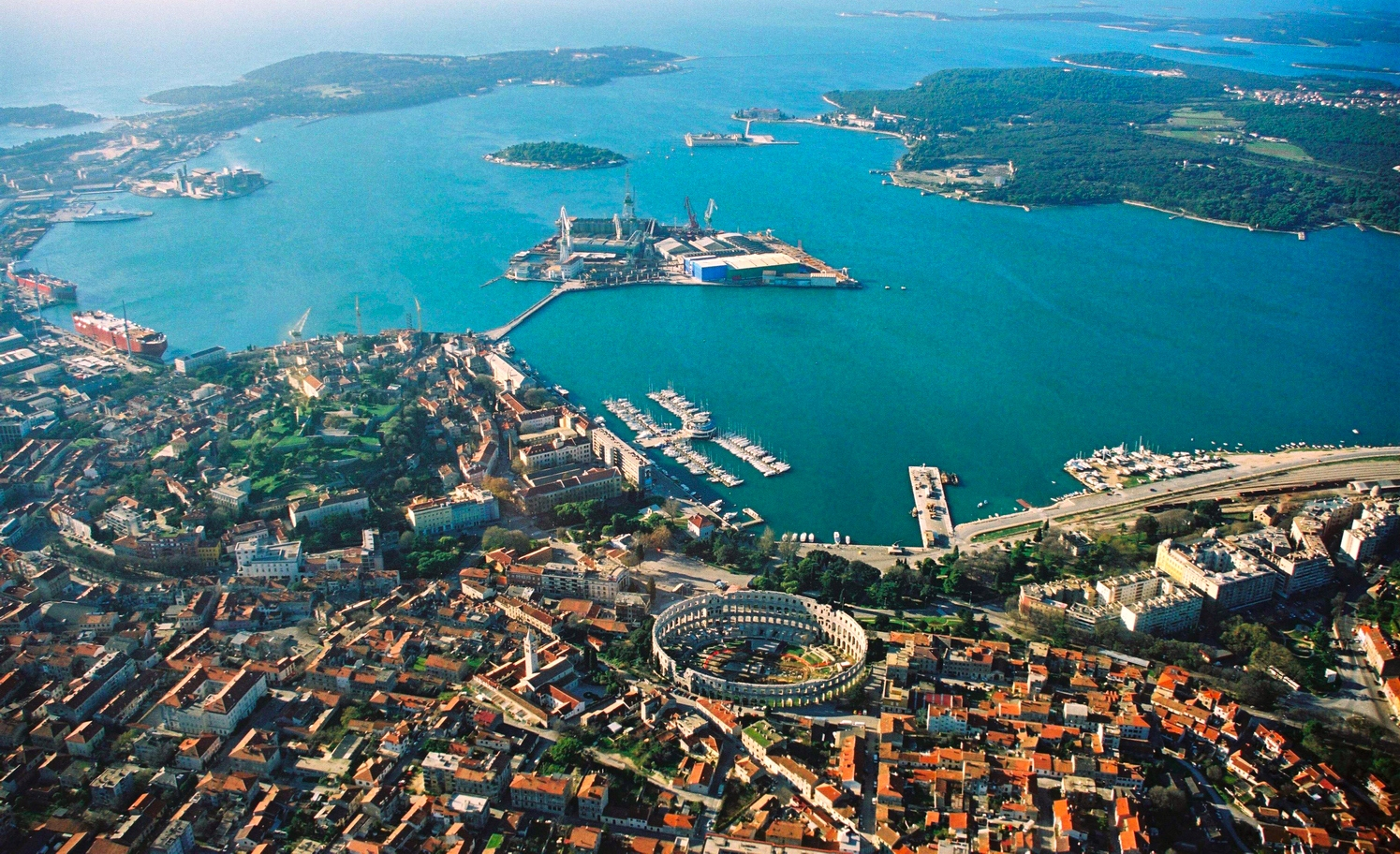
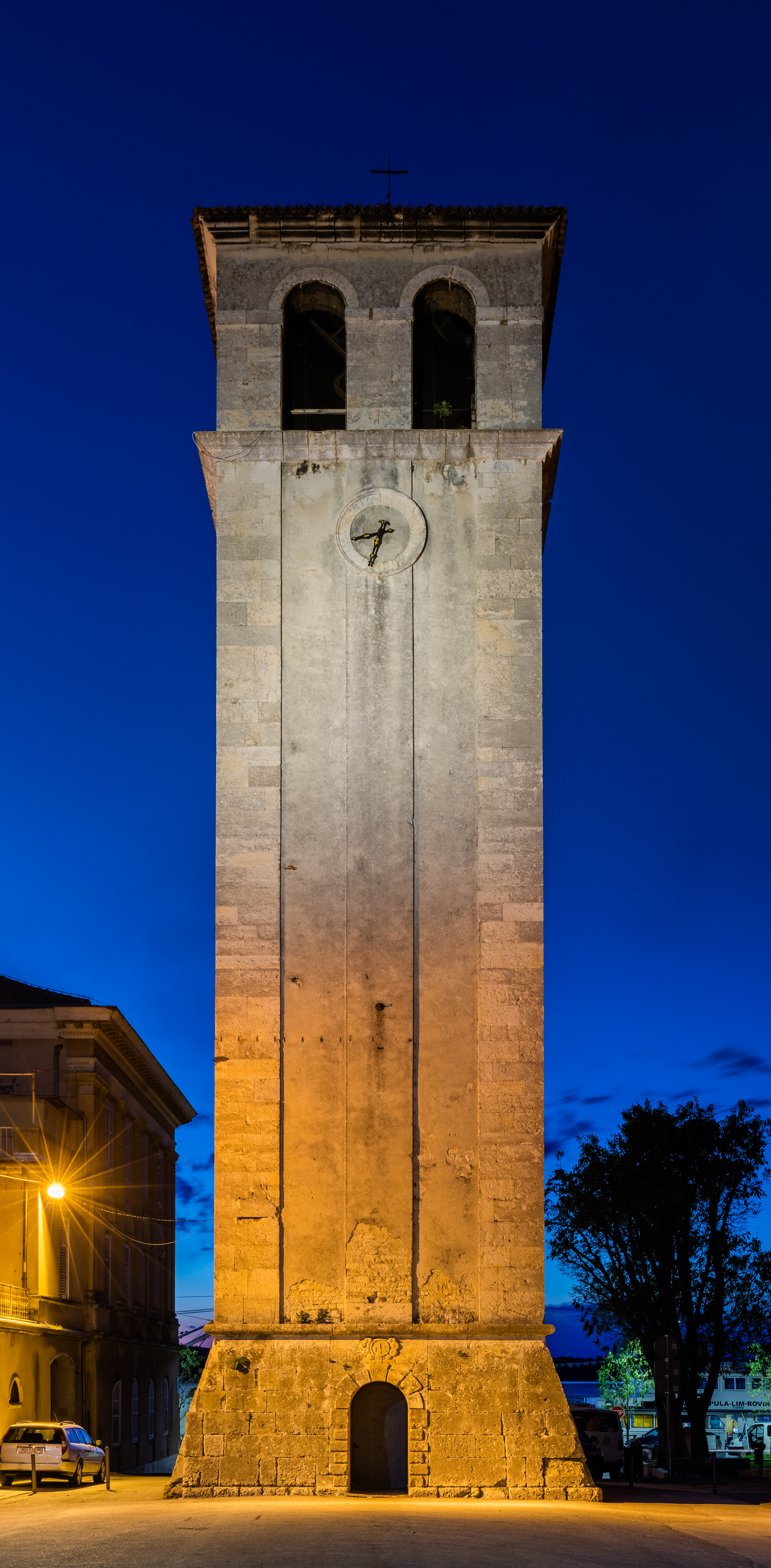
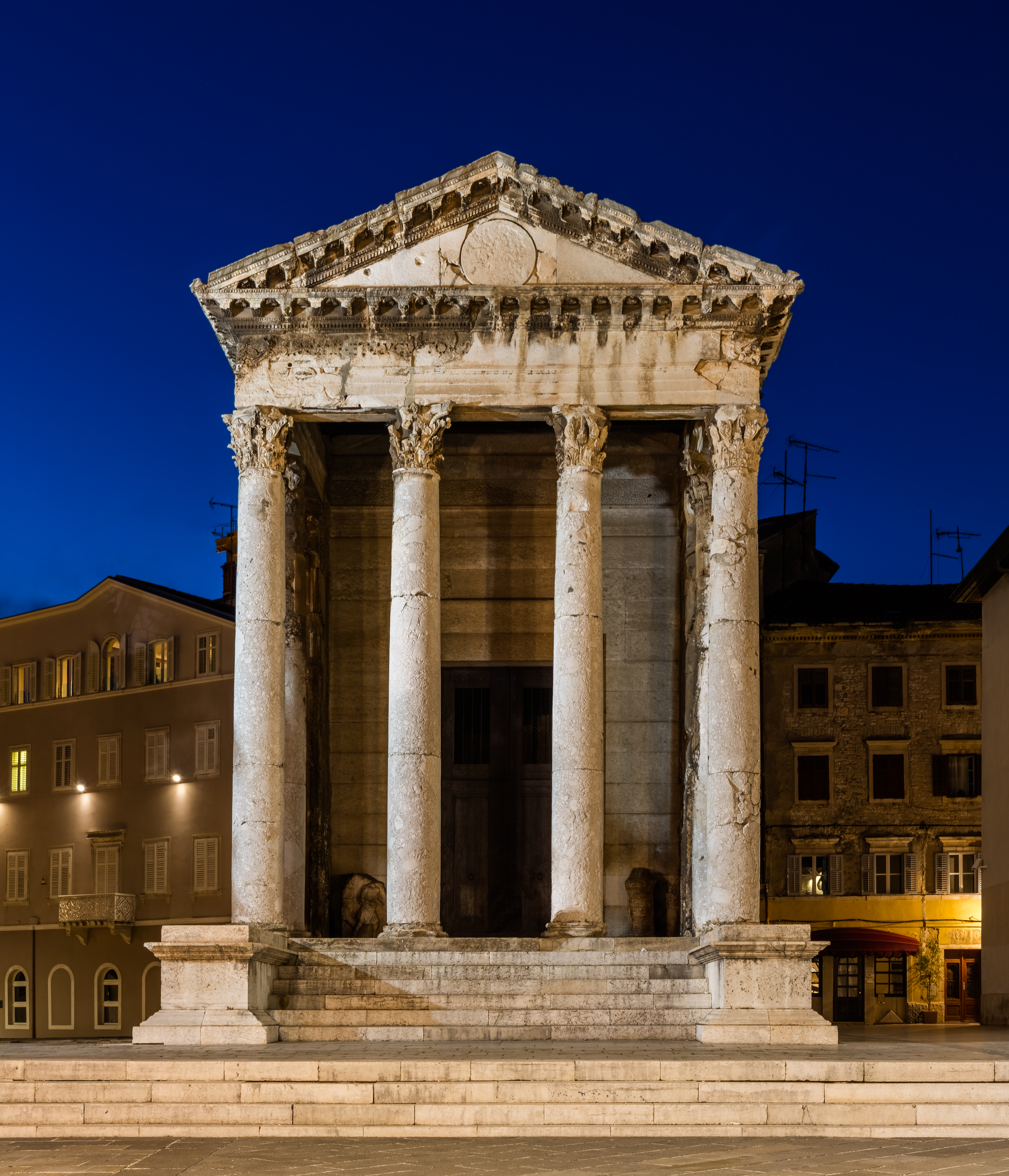
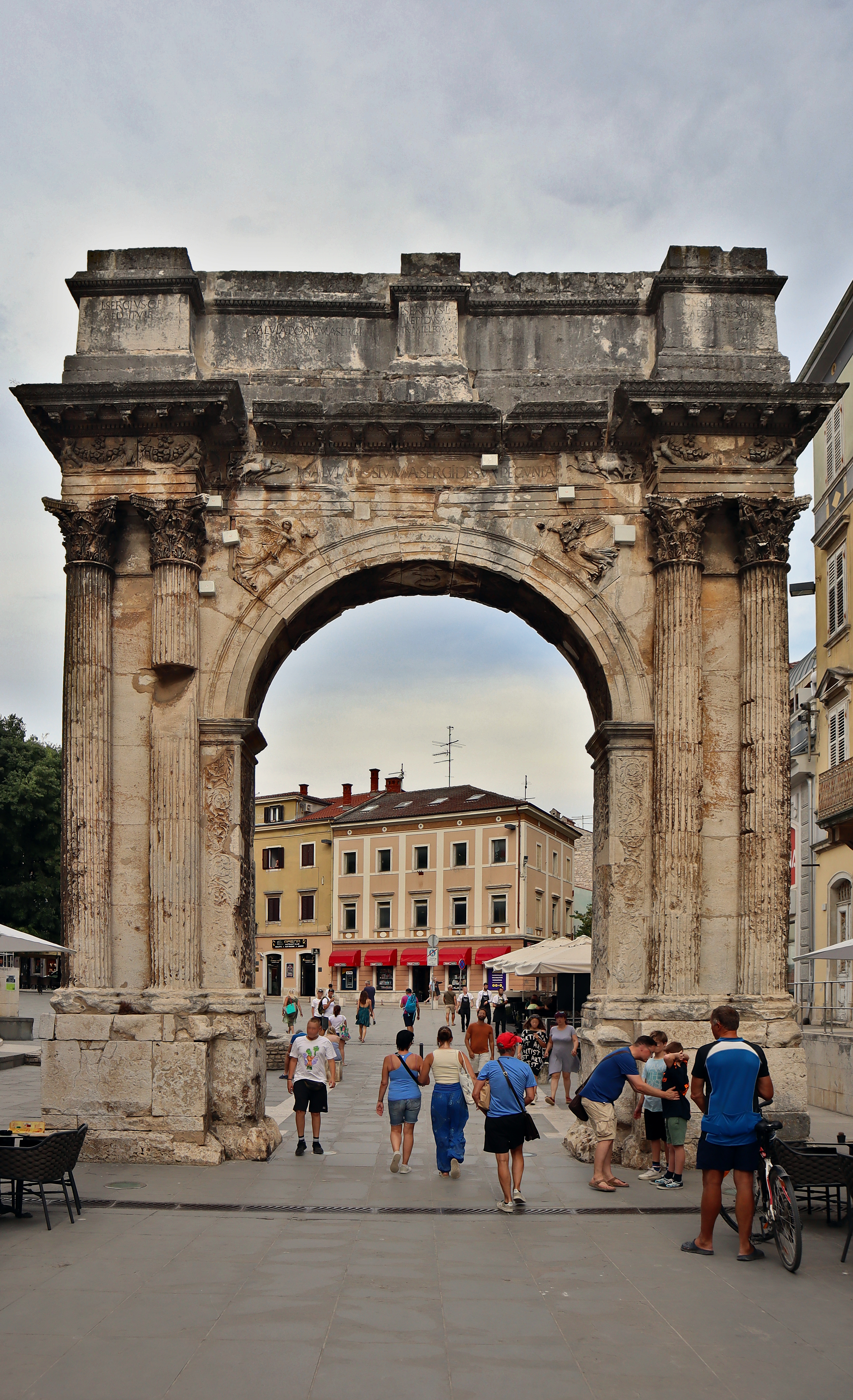
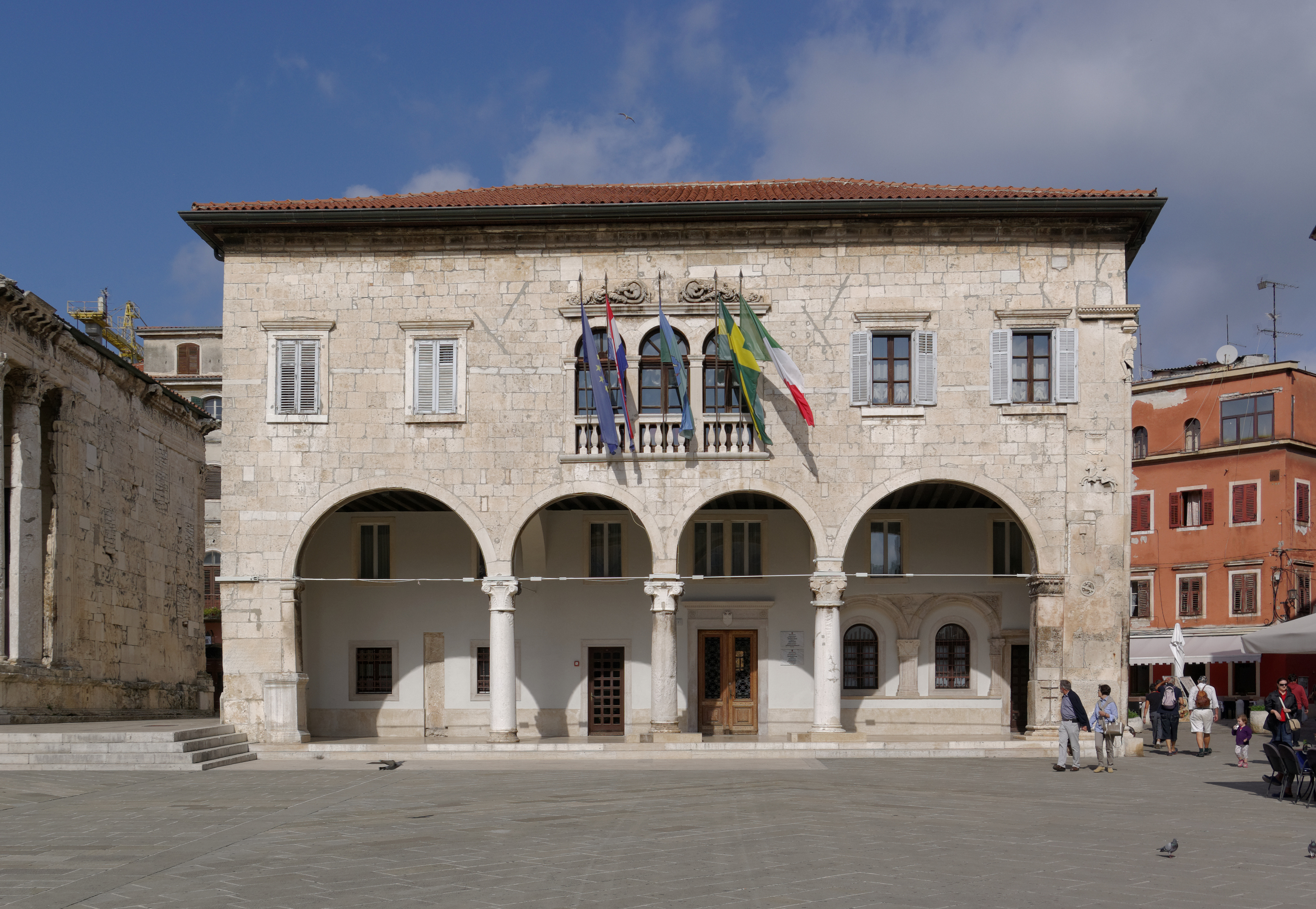
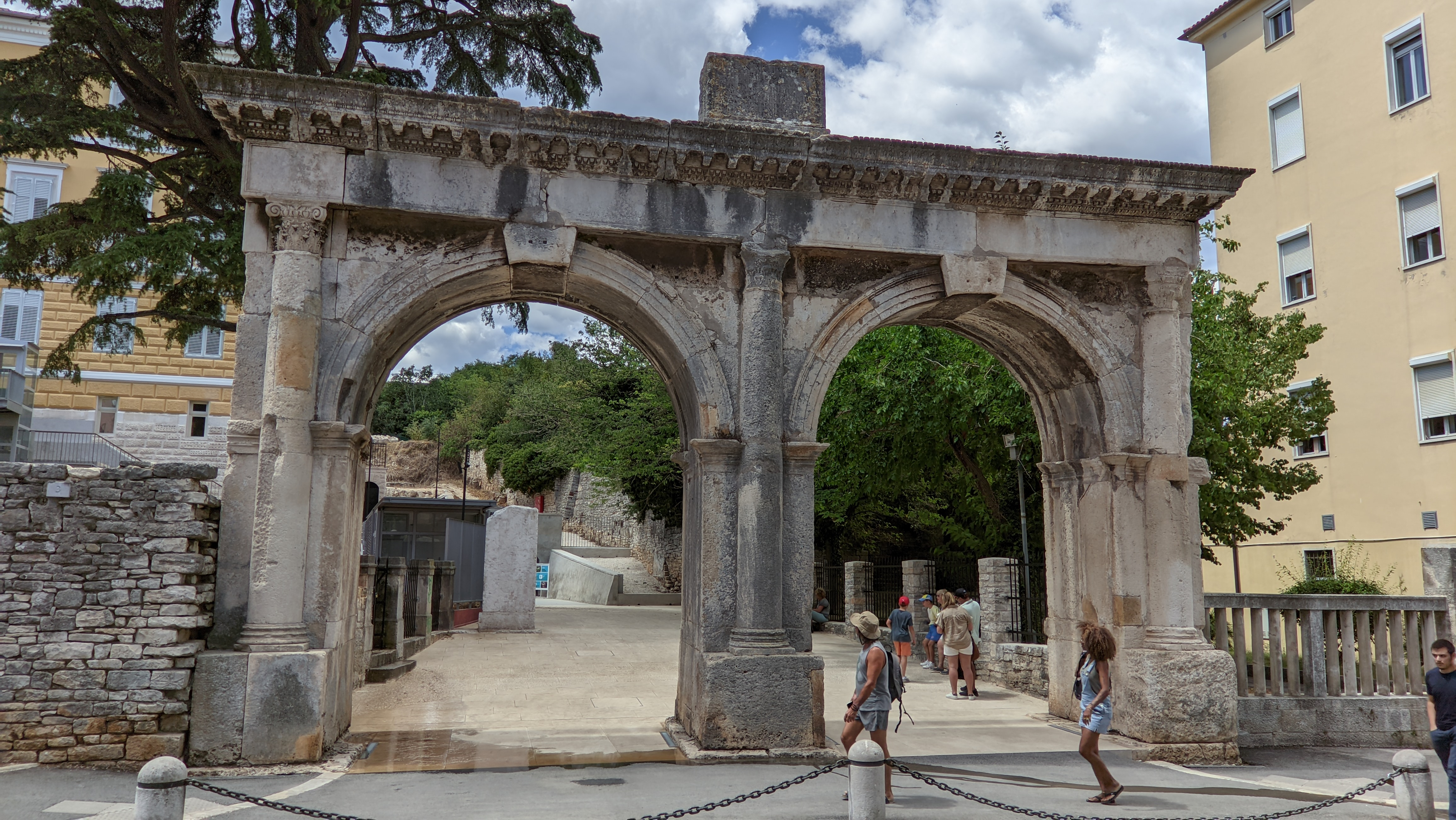
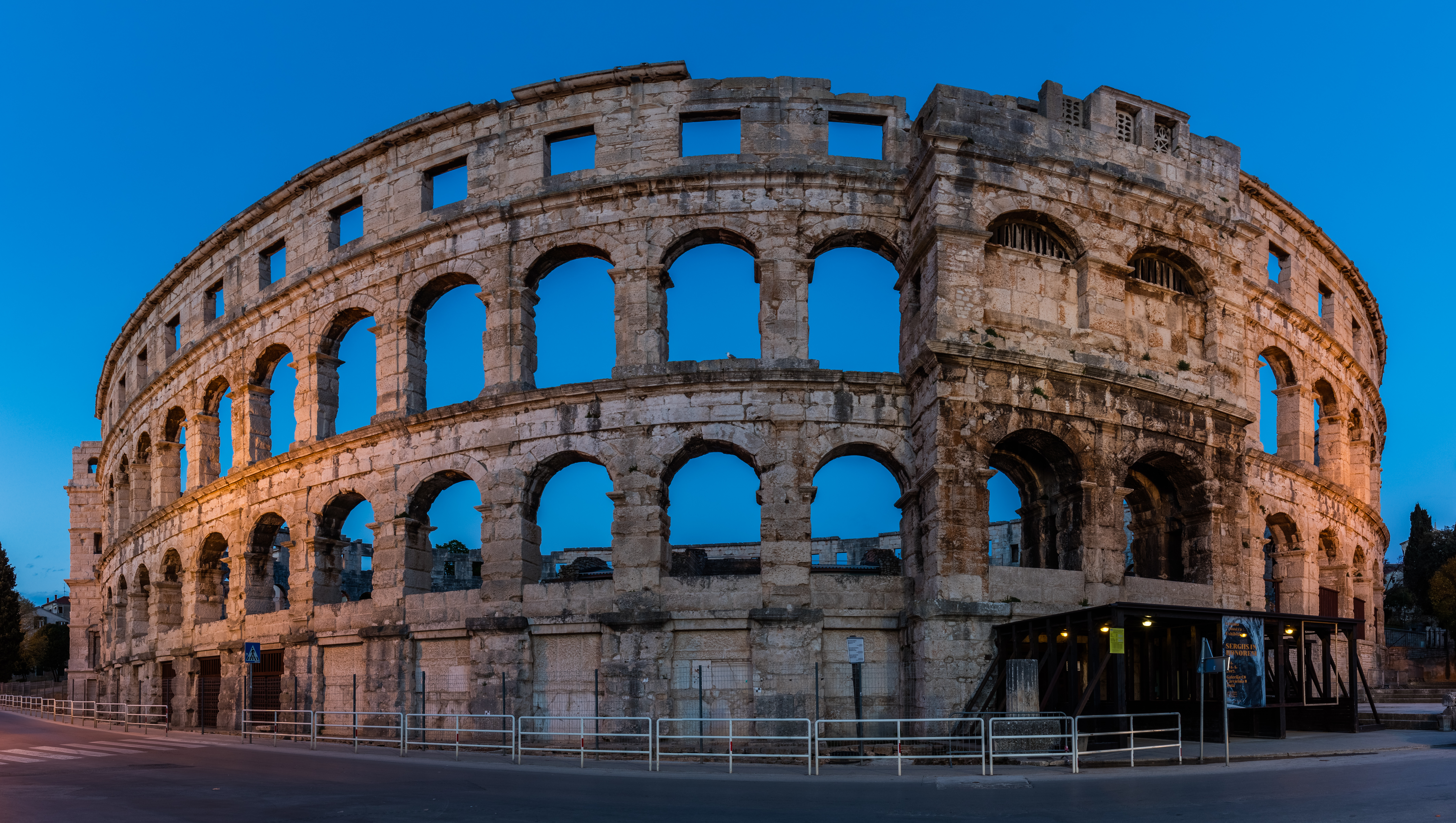
- Pula Aerial View Pula Cathedral Temple of Augustus Arch of the Sergii Town Hall Porta Gemina Pula Arena

- Flag Coat of arms
- Interactive map of Pula
- Location within Croatia Location within Europe
- Coordinates: 44°52′13″N 13°50′44″E
- Country: Croatia
- Region: Istria
- County: Istria County

Government
  - Mayor: Peđa Grbin (SDP)
  - City Council: 22 members: IDS (5); F. Zoričić NL (5); SDP (4); G. Mihovilović NL (2); M! (2); L. Boljunčić NL (2); HDZ (1); TBD (1)

Area
  - City: 53.8 km^{2} (20.8 sq mi)
  - Land: 41.59 km^{2} (16.06 sq mi)
  - Urban: 53.8 km^{2} (20.8 sq mi)
- Elevation: 30 m (98 ft)

Population (2021)
  - City: 52,220
  - Density: 1,256/km^{2} (3,252/sq mi)
  - Urban: 52,220
  - Urban density: 971/km^{2} (2,510/sq mi)
- Time zone: UTC+1 (CET)
  - Summer (DST): UTC+2 (CEST)
- Postal code: HR-52 100
- Area code: +385 52
- Vehicle registration: PU
- Website: pula.hr

Pula, (Note: Croatian: [pǔːla]) also known as Pola, (Note: Italian: [ˈpɔːla]; Venetian: Pola; Istriot: Puola; Slovene: Pulj; Hungarian: Póla) its Italian name, is the largest city in Istria County, western Croatia, and the seventh-largest city in the country, situated at the southern tip of the Istrian peninsula in western Croatia, with a population of 52,220 in 2021. It is known for its multitude of ancient Roman buildings, the most famous of which is the Pula Arena, one of the best preserved Roman amphitheaters. The city has a long tradition of wine making, fishing, shipbuilding, and tourism. It was the administrative centre of Istria from ancient Roman times until superseded by Pazin in 1991.

== History ==
=== Pre-history ===
Evidence of the presence of Homo erectus one million years ago has been found in the cave of Šandalja near Pula. Pottery from the Neolithic period (6000–2000 BC), indicating human settlement, has been found around Pula. In the Bronze Age (1800–1000 BC), a new type of settlement appeared in Istria, called 'gradine', or hill-top fortifications. Many late Bronze Age bone objects, such as tools for smoothing and drilling, sewing needles, as well as spiral bronze pendants, have been found in the area around Pula. The type of materials found in Bronze Age sites in Istria connects these with sites along the Danube. The inhabitants of Istria in the Bronze Age are known as Proto Illyrians.

Greek pottery and a part of a statue of Apollo have been found, attesting to the presence or influence of Greek culture. Greek tradition attributed the foundation of Polai to the Colchians, mentioned in the context of the story of Jason and Medea, who had stolen the Golden Fleece. The Colchians, who had chased Jason into the northern Adriatic, were unable to catch him and ended up settling in a place they called Polai, signifying "city of refuge".

=== Ancient period ===
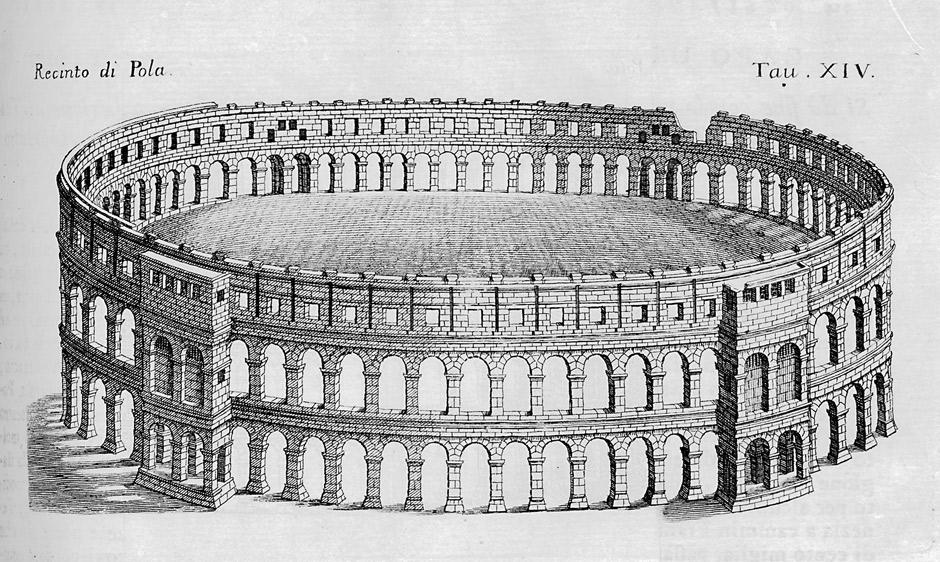
Pula Arena in 1728

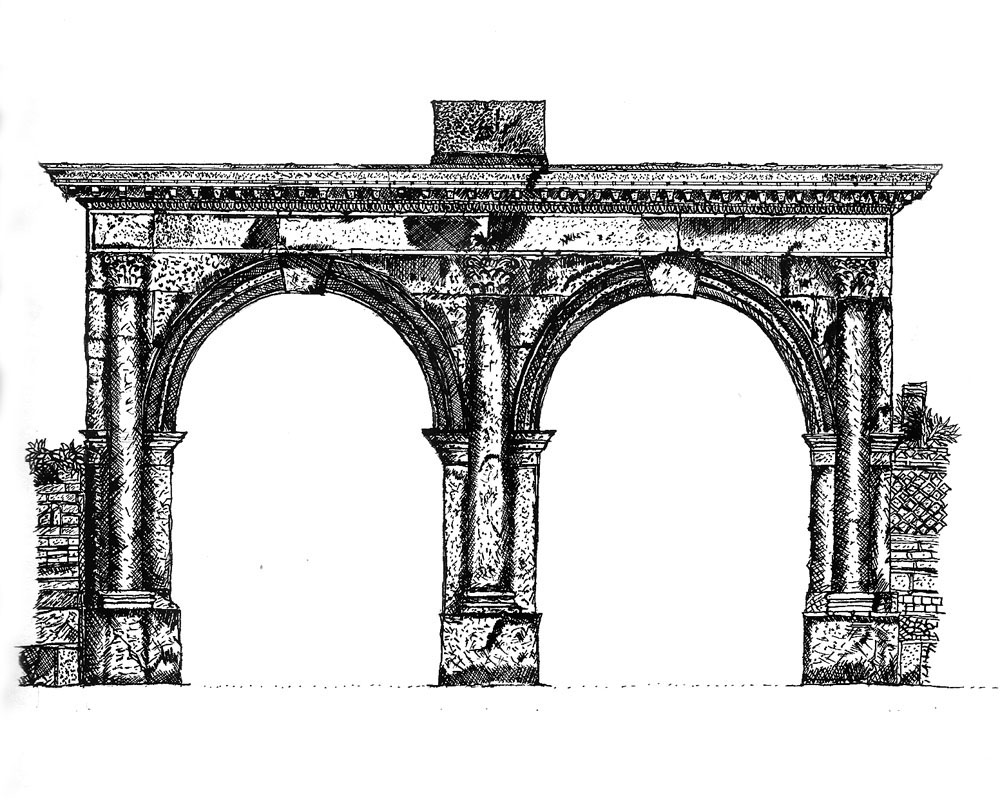
Porta Gemina

In classical antiquity, it was inhabited by the Histri, a Venetic or Illyrian tribe. Callimachus, Strabo, Pomponius Mela and Lycophron wrote that it was inhabited by Colchians. Ancient Greek authors wrote that the Greeks called it Phygadon (Φυγάδων, "Town of Fugitives") and that the Colchian inhabitants called it Pola (Πόλα) in their own language. The Istrian peninsula was conquered by the Romans in 177 BC, starting a period of Romanization. The town was elevated to colonial rank between 46 and 45 BC as the tenth region of the late Roman Republic, under Julius Caesar. During that time the town grew and had at its zenith a population of about 30,000. It became a significant Roman port with a large surrounding area under its jurisdiction.

During the civil war of 42 BC of the triumvirate of Octavian, Mark Antony and Lepidus against Caesar's assassins Brutus and Cassius, the town took the side of Cassius, since the town had been founded by Cassius Longinus, brother of Cassius. After Octavian's victory, the town was demolished. It was soon rebuilt at the request of Octavian's daughter Iulia and was then called Colonia Pietas Iulia Pola Pollentia Herculanea. The colony was part of Venetia et Histria, a region of Roman Italy. Great classical constructions were built of which a few remain.

A great amphitheatre, Pula Arena, was constructed between 27 BC and 68 AD, much of it still standing to this day. The Romans also supplied the city with water and sewage systems. They fortified the city with a wall with ten gates. A few of these gates remain: the triumphal Arch of the Sergii, the Gate of Hercules (in which the names of the founders of the city are engraved), and the Twin Gates. During the reign of the emperor Septimius Severus the name of the town was changed to "Res Publica Polensis". The town was the site of an execution of two reigning caesares, Crispus in 326 AD and Constantius Gallus in 354 AD. In 425 AD the town became the centre of a diocese, attested by the remains of foundations of a few religious buildings.

=== Middle Ages ===
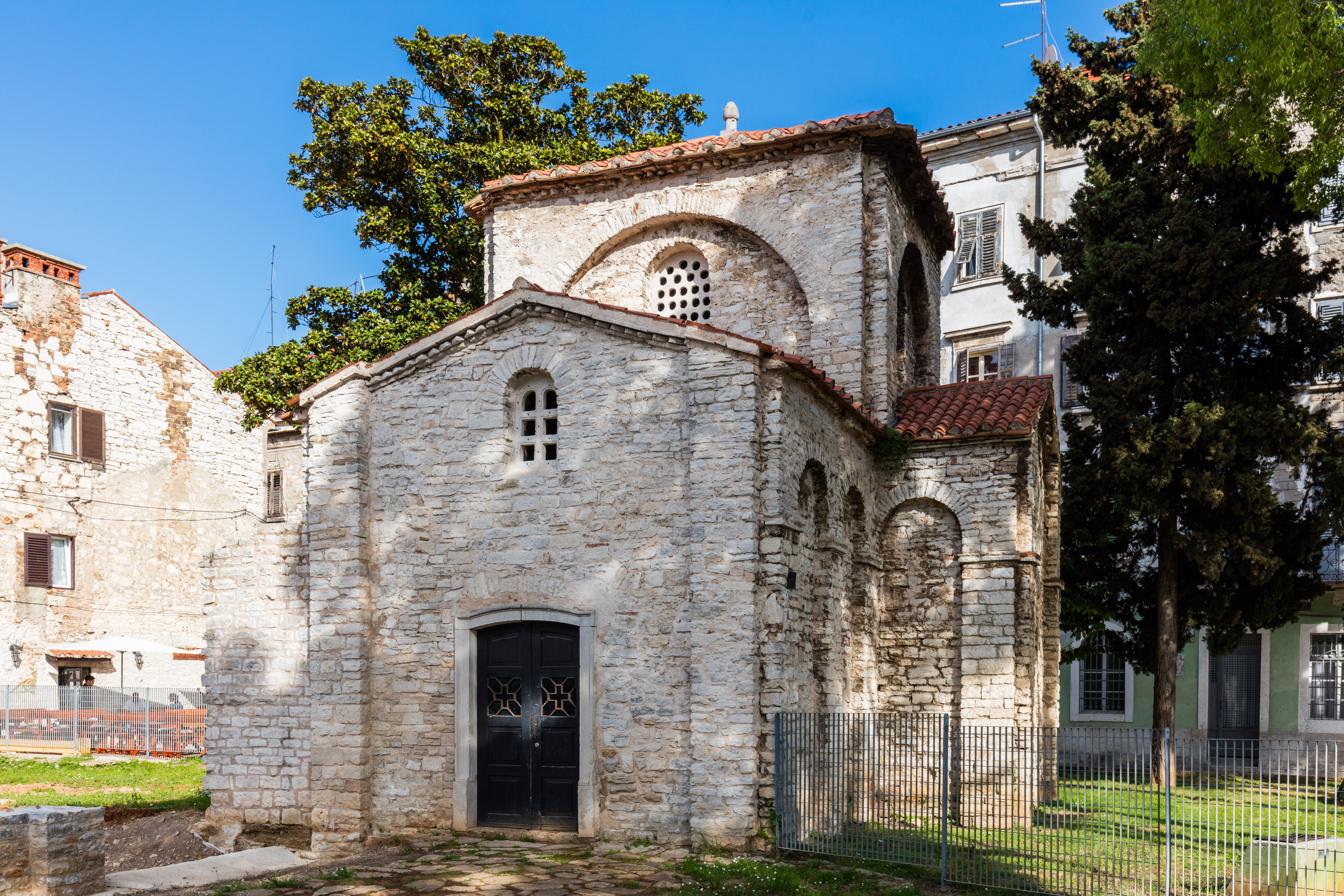
Chapel of St. Mary Formosa

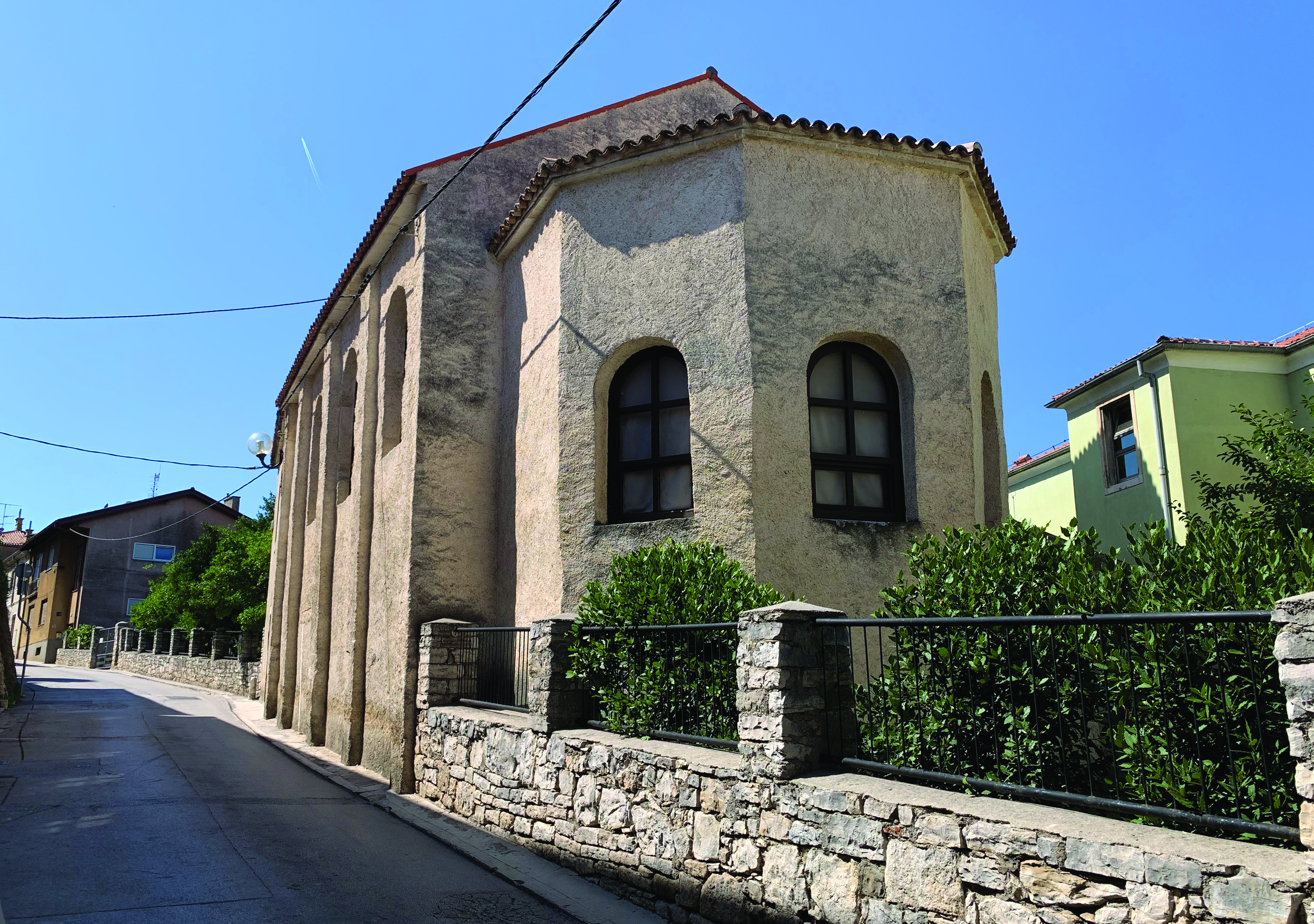
Church of St Nicholas (Sv. Mikula)

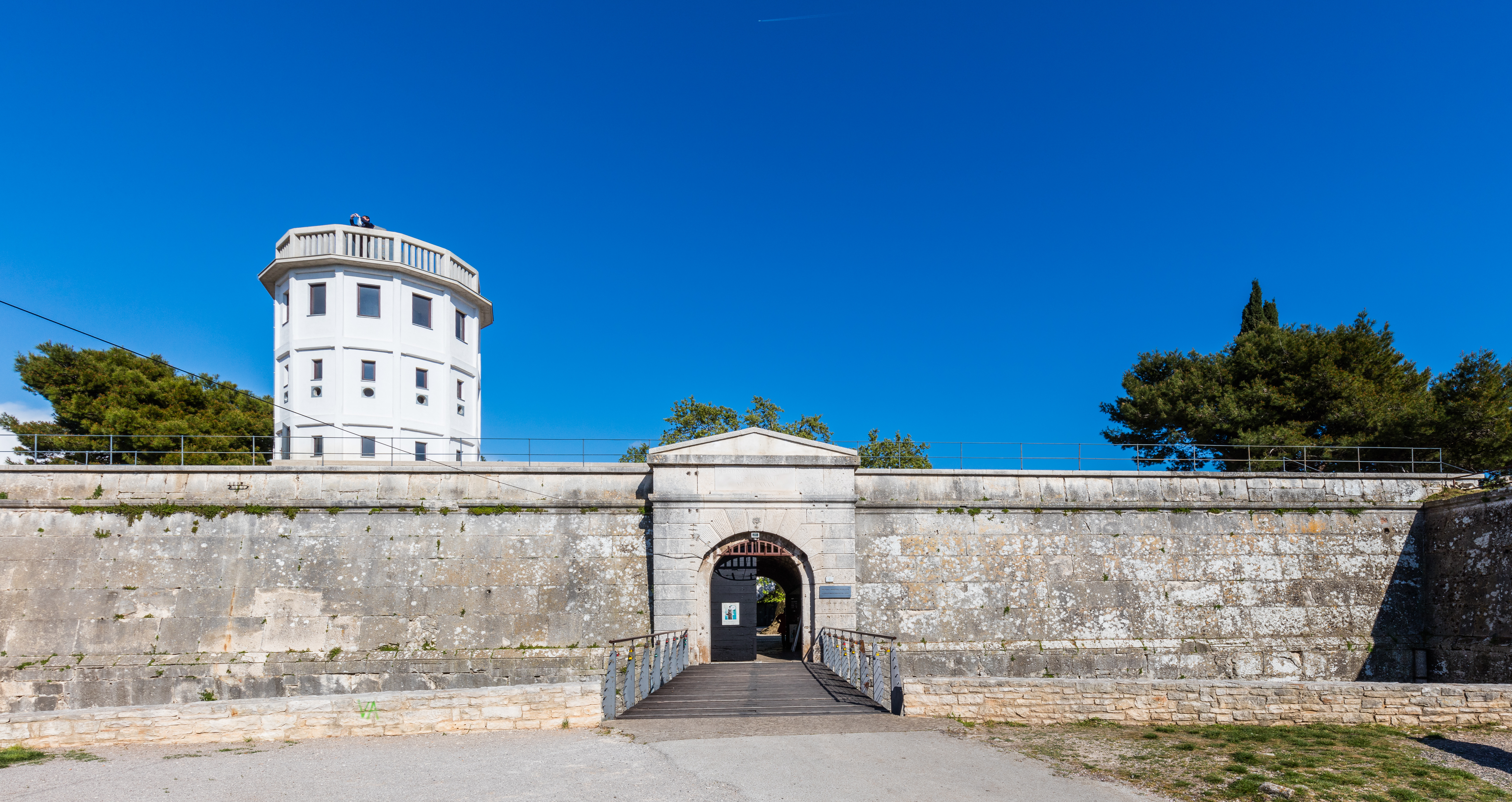
Kaštel Pula

After the fall of the Western Roman Empire, the city and region were attacked by the Ostrogoths, Pula being virtually destroyed by Odoacer, a Germanic foederati general in 476 AD. The town was ruled by the Ostrogoths from 493 to 538 AD. When their rule ended, Pula came under the rule of the Exarchate of Ravenna (540–751). During this period Pula prospered and became the major port of the Byzantine fleet and an integral part of the Byzantine Empire. The Basilica of Saint Mary Formosa was built in the 6th century.

From 788 onwards, Pula was ruled by the Frankish Empire under Charlemagne, with the introduction of the feudal system. Under the Franks it was part of the Kingdom of Italy. Pula became the seat of the elective counts of Istria until 1077. The town was taken in 1148 by the Venetians and in 1150 Pula swore allegiance to the Republic of Venice, thus becoming a Venetian possession. For centuries thereafter, the city's fate and fortunes were tied to those of Venetian power. It was conquered by the Pisans in 1192 but soon reconquered by the Venetians.

In 1238 Pope Gregory IX formed an alliance between Genoa and Venice against the Empire, and consequently against Pisa too. As Pula had sided with the Pisans, the city was sacked by the Venetians in 1243. It was destroyed again in 1267 and again in 1397 when the Genoese defeated the Venetians in a naval battle. Pula then slowly went into decline. This decay was accelerated by the infighting of local families: the ancient Roman Sergi family and the Ionotasi (1258–1271) and the clash between Venice and Genoa for the control of the city and its harbour (late 13th and 14th centuries). In 1291, by the Peace of Treviso, Patriarch Raimondo della Torre gained the city as part of the secular realm of the Patriarchate of Aquileia, only to lose it to Venice in 1331, which then held it until its downfall in 1797.

Pula is mentioned by the Italian poet Dante Alighieri, who had visited Pula, in the Divine Comedy: "Sì come a Pola, presso del Carnaro, ch'Italia chiude e i suoi termini bagna" or "As Pola, along the Quarnero, that marks the end of Italy and bathes its boundaries".

=== Venetian, Napoleonic and early Habsburg rule ===
The Venetians took over Pula in 1331 and would rule the city until 1797. During the 14th, 15th and 16th centuries, Pula was attacked and occupied by the Genoese, the Hungarian army and the Habsburgs; several outlying medieval settlements and towns were destroyed. In addition to war, the plague, malaria and typhoid ravaged the city. By the 1750s there were only 3,000 inhabitants left in ancient city, an area now covered with weeds and ivy.

With the collapse of the Venetian Republic in 1797 following Napoleon's Treaty of Campo Formio, the city became part of the Habsburg monarchy. It was invaded again in 1805 after the French had defeated the Austrians. It was included in the French Empire of Napoleon as part of the Kingdom of Italy, then placed directly under the French Empire's Illyrian Provinces.

=== Austrian Littoral province and union with Italy ===
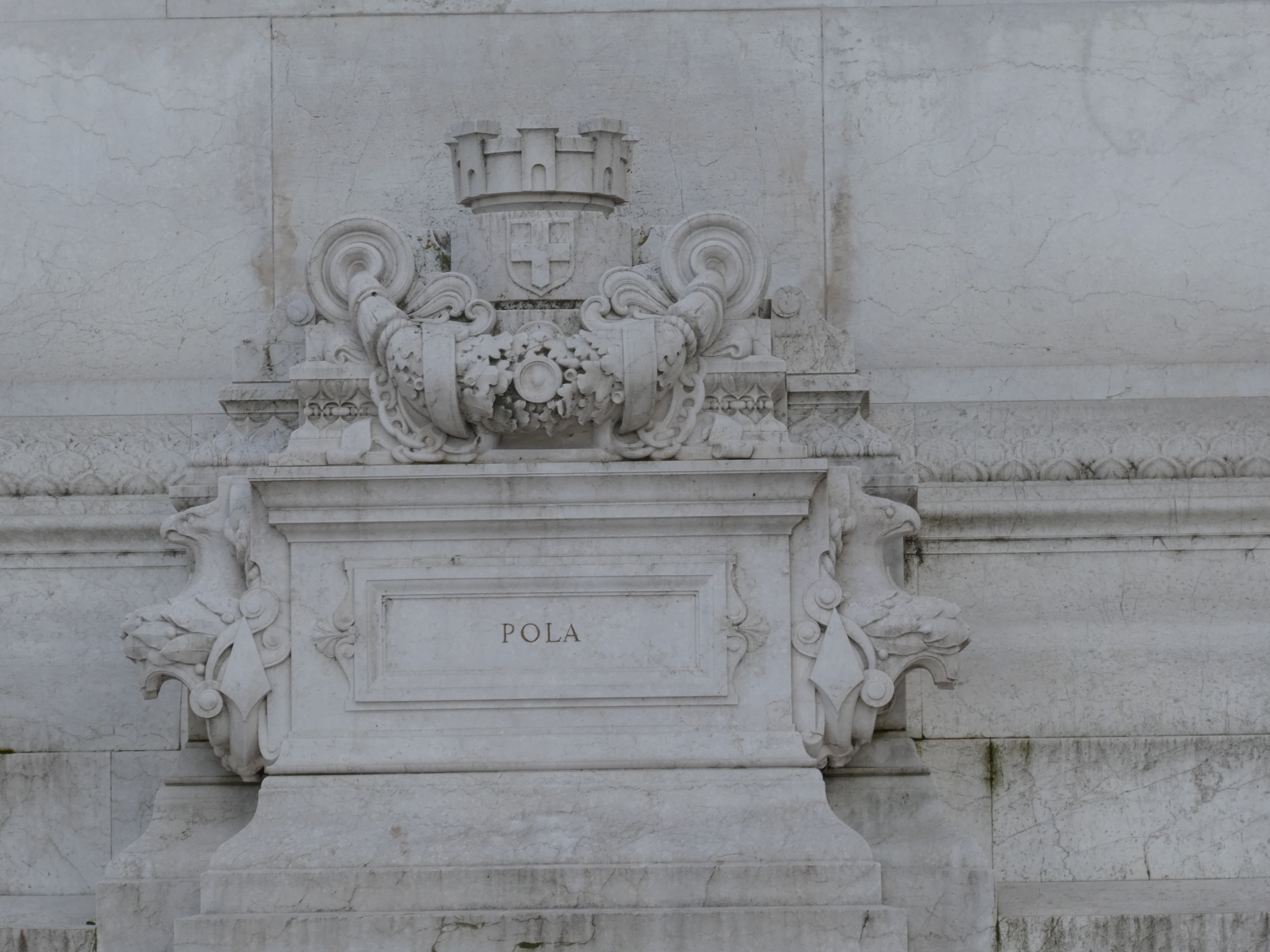
Altar of the city of Pola at the Altare della Patria in Rome, Italy. Pola was at the time a so-called "irredent land"

In 1813, Pola (with Istria) came back to the Austrian Empire. Pola became the premier naval port for the empire in the late 1850s. Around this time numerous Martello towers, like Fort Munide, were constructed around the port. Under the compromise of 1867, the town – under the original Italian name, Pola – remained in Austria-Hungary until the latter's defeat and dissolution in 1918. Under Austrian rule, Pola regained prosperity. Its large natural harbour became Austria's main naval base and a major shipbuilding centre. It was chosen for the base in 1859 by Hans Birch Dahlerup, a Danish admiral in the service of Austria. Subsequently, Pola grew from a fading provincial town into an industrial city. The island of Brioni (in Croatian renamed Brijuni) to the North West of Pola became the summer vacation resort of Austria's Habsburg royal family. In World War I, the port was the main base for Austro-Hungarian dreadnoughts and other naval forces of the Empire. During this period many inhabitants were Italian speaking. The 1910 Austrian census recorded a city population of 58,562 (45.8% Italian speaking; 15.2% Croatian, the rest were mostly German-speaking military).

Following the collapse of Austria-Hungary in 1918, Pola and the whole of Istria, except the territory of Castua/Kastav, went to Italy. Pola became the capital of the Province of Pola. The decline in population after World War I was mainly due to economic difficulties caused by the withdrawal of Austro-Hungarian military and bureaucratic facilities and the dismissal of workers from the shipyard. Under the Italian Fascist government of Benito Mussolini, non-Italians, especially Croatian residents who came to Pola under Austro-Hungarian rule, faced stringent political and cultural repression because they had now to integrate themselves into the Kingdom of Italy and learn the Italian language. Many left the city and went back to the newly created Yugoslavia. After the collapse of Fascist Italy in 1943, the city was occupied by the German Wehrmacht and remained a base for U-boats. Consequently, the city was subjected to repeated Allied bombing from 1942 to 1944. In the last phase of the war, Pola saw the arrest, deportation, and execution of people suspected of aiding the Axis, by the partisans who together with the Yugoslav communists liberated but also killed many soldiers and civilians, in the first episodes of what would be named, later on, the Foibe massacres.

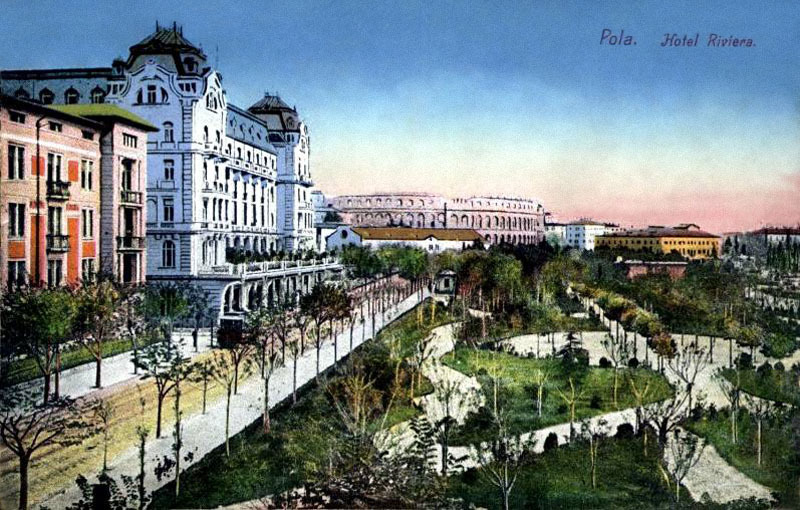
Pula Riviera in 1904

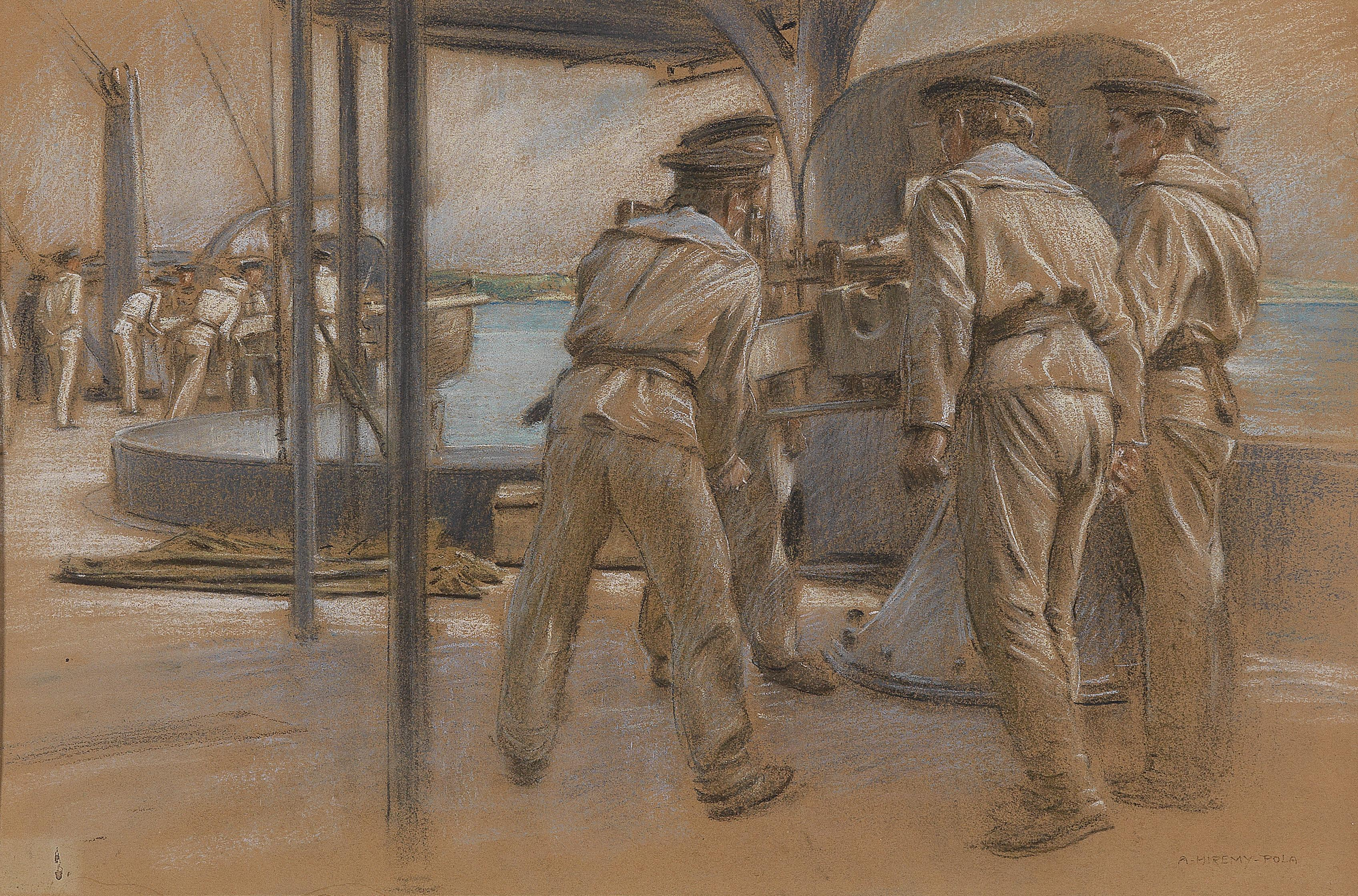
Adolf Hirémy-Hirschl, Sailors in the Harbor of Pola, pastel on paper, c. 1916. The Jack Daulton Collection, Los Altos Hills, California.

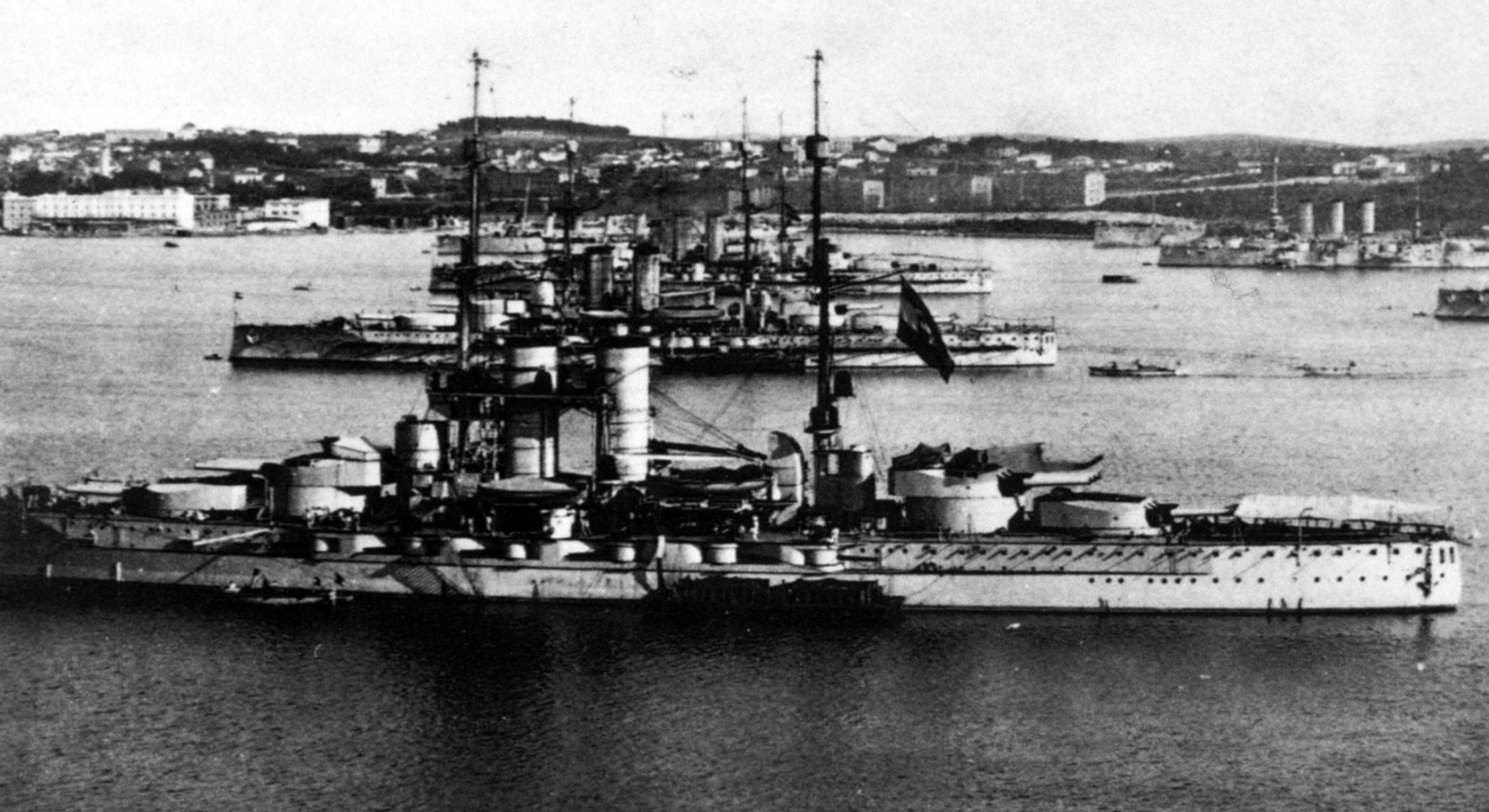
Austro-Hungarian dreadnoughts at Pola

Flag in use during the Italian rule of the city

Coat of arms in use during the Italian rule of the city

=== Post–World War II and modern era ===
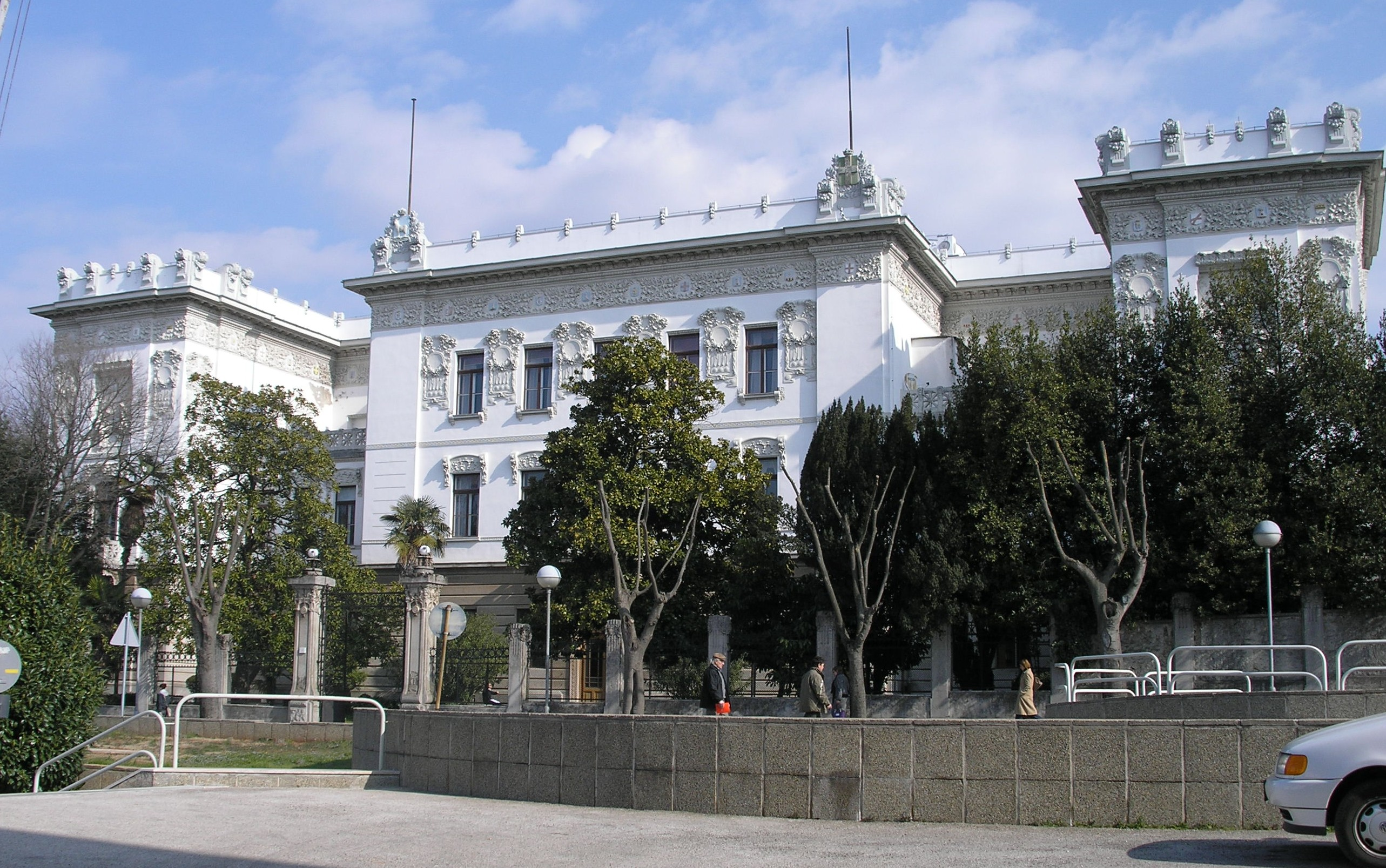
Pula University building

After World War II, the Istrian Italians of Pula left Yugoslavia towards Italy (Istrian-Dalmatian exodus). For two years after 1945, Pola was administered by the Allied Military Government for Occupied Territories (AMG). Pola formed an enclave within south Istria that was administered by Yugoslavia since 1945 with the help of Churchill. The AMG was occupied by a company of the United States 351st Infantry and a British battalion of the 24th Guards Brigade. Istria was partitioned into occupation zones until the region became officially united with the Federal People's Republic of Yugoslavia on 15 September 1947, under terms of the Paris Peace Treaties. The city became part of the People's Republic of Croatia, a federal state within FPR Yugoslavia, upon the ratification of the Paris Peace Treaties on 15 September 1947 – which also created the Free Territory of Trieste. Initially, Pola's population of 45,000 was largely made up of ethnic Italians, however, between December 1946 and September 1947, the vast majority of Italians fled to Italy. Subsequently, the city's Croatian name, Pula, became the official name. Today the city of Pula or Pola is officially bilingual, Croatian and Italian, hence both Pula and Pola are official names.

== Geography and climate ==
Pula (Pula, City of Pula)

Climate chart (precipitation, max. and min. temperature)
J	F	M	A	M	J	J	A	S	O	N	D
78 10 2	64 10 2	65 13 4	70 16 8	56 21 12	53 25 16	48 28 18	75 28 18	85 24 15	85 20 12	80 14 7	112 10 4
- █ Average max. and min. temperatures in °C
- █ Precipitation totals in mm
- Source: EuroWeather
Imperial conversion
J	F	M	A	M	J	J	A	S	O	N	D
3.1 50 36	2.5 50 36	2.6 55 39	2.8 61 46	2.2 70 54	2.1 77 61	1.9 82 64	3 82 64	3.3 75 59	3.3 68 54	3.1 57 45	4.4 50 39
- █ Average max. and min. temperatures in °F
- █ Precipitation totals in inches

The city lies on and beneath seven hills (Monte Zaro, Monte Serpente, Monte Ghiro, Monte Magno, Monte Paradiso, Monte Rizzi and Monte Vidal) on the inner part of a wide gulf and a naturally well-protected port (depth up to 38 m (125 ft)) open to the northwest with two entrances: from the sea and through Fažana channel.

Today, Pula's geographical area amounts to 5,165 ha (12,760 acres), 4,159 ha (10,280 acres) on land and 1,015 ha (2,510 acres) at sea, bounded from the north by islands Sv. Jerolim and Kozada, city areas Štinjan/Stignano, Veli Vrh/Monte Grande and Sianna with its 'Kaiserwald' forest; from the east area Monteserpo, Valmade, Busoler and Valdebek; from the south with the old gas works, commercial port Veruda and island Veruda; and from the west Verudela, Lungomare and Musil.

Protected from the north by the mountain chain of Alps as well the inner highland, the climate is humid subtropical (Köppen climate classification: Cfa), with the highest air temperature averaging 23 °C (73 °F) during July and August and lowest averaging 6 °C (43 °F), in January and February. Summers are usually quite hot, although some unusual heat wave patterns are also common.

Normally, it is humid. Temperatures above 10 °C (50 °F) last for more than 240 days a year. There are two different kinds of winds here – the bora brings cold and clear weather from the north in winter, and the southern Sirocco bringing rain in summer. The 'Maestral' is a summer breeze blowing from the inland to the sea.

Like the rest of the region Pula is known for its mild climate and tame sea with an average of sunny days of 2,316 hours per year or 6.3 hours a day, with an average air temperature of 13.7 °C (56.7 °F) (6.1 °C (43.0 °F) in February to 26.4 °C (79.5 °F) in July and August) and sea temperature from 7 °C (45 °F) to 26 °C (79 °F).

Since records began in 1963, the highest temperature recorded at the local weather station was 39.0 °C (102.2 °F), on 5 August 2017. The coldest temperature was −9.0 °C (15.8 °F), on both 3 January 1979 and 3 February 1991.

Climate data for Pula
Month	Jan	Feb	Mar	Apr	May	Jun	Jul	Aug	Sep	Oct	Nov	Dec	Year
Mean daily maximum °C (°F)	10 (50)	10 (50)	13 (55)	16 (61)	21 (70)	25 (77)	28 (82)	28 (82)	24 (75)	20 (68)	14 (57)	10 (50)	18 (65)
Daily mean °C (°F)	6 (43)	6 (43)	9 (48)	12 (54)	17 (63)	21 (70)	23 (73)	23 (73)	20 (68)	16 (61)	11 (52)	7 (45)	14 (58)
Mean daily minimum °C (°F)	2 (36)	2 (36)	4 (39)	8 (46)	12 (54)	16 (61)	18 (64)	18 (64)	15 (59)	12 (54)	7 (45)	4 (39)	10 (50)
Average rainfall mm (inches)	78 (3.1)	64 (2.5)	65 (2.6)	70 (2.8)	56 (2.2)	53 (2.1)	48 (1.9)	75 (3.0)	85 (3.3)	85 (3.3)	80 (3.1)	112 (4.4)	871 (34.3)
Average rainy days	12	12	12	13	13	13	10	11	11	12	13	13	145
Mean daily sunshine hours	3	4	5	6	8	9	10	9	7	5	3	3	6
Percentage possible sunshine	33	40	42	43	53	56	67	64	58	45	30	33	47
Source 1: EuroWeather
Source 2: Weather Atlas (sunshine data)

Climate data for Pula
Month	Jan	Feb	Mar	Apr	May	Jun	Jul	Aug	Sep	Oct	Nov	Dec	Year
Average sea temperature °C (°F)	11.3 (52.4)	10.4 (50.7)	11.2 (52.1)	13.7 (56.7)	18.2 (64.8)	23.0 (73.3)	25.0 (77.0)	25.2 (77.3)	23.7 (74.6)	19.6 (67.3)	16.8 (62.3)	14.2 (57.5)	17.7 (63.8)
Mean daily daylight hours	9.0	10.0	12.0	14.0	15.0	16.0	15.0	14.0	12.0	11.0	10.0	9.0	12.3
Average Ultraviolet index	1	2	3	5	7	8	8	7	5	3	2	1	4.3
Source: Weather Atlas

== Population ==
Historical population
Year	Pop.	±%
1857	3,628	—
1869	10,601	+192.2%
1880	25,390	+139.5%
1890	31,498	+24.1%
1900	36,143	+14.7%
1910	59,498	+64.6%
1921	38,591	−35.1%
1931	44,219	+14.6%
1948	20,812	−52.9%
1953	28,259	+35.8%
1961	37,099	+31.3%
1971	47,156	+27.1%
1981	56,153	+19.1%
1991	62,378	+11.1%
2001	58,594	−6.1%
2011	57,460	−1.9%
2021	52,220	−9.1%
Source: Naselja i stanovništvo Republike Hrvatske 1857–2021, DZS

Pula is the largest city in Istria County, with a metropolitan area of 90,000 people. The city itself has 57,460 residents (census 2011), while the metropolitan area includes Barban/Barbana (2,802 residents), Fažana/Fasana (3,050 residents), Ližnjan/Lisignano (2,945 residents), Marčana/Marzana (3,903 residents), Medulin/Medolino (6,004 residents), Svetvinčenat/Sanvicenti (2,218 residents) and Vodnjan/Dignano (5,651 residents). Its population density is 1,093.27/km^{2} (2,831.6/sq mi), ranking Pula fifth in Croatia.

In 1910 Pula had a total of 58,562 inhabitants, of which 45.8% were Istrian Italians, 15.2% Croatians, while the rest of the population was mostly ethnic Germans. The number of Istrian Italians in Pula decreased drastically following the Istrian-Dalmatian exodus, which occurred from 1943 to 1960.

Its birth rate is 1.795 per cent and its mortality rate is 1.014 per cent (in 2001 466 people were born and 594 deceased), with a natural population decrease of 0.219 per cent and vital index of 78.45. The majority of its citizens are Croats representing 75.88% of the population (2021 census). The largest ethnic minorities are: 2,661 Serbs (5.10 per cent), 1,860 local Italians (3.56 per cent), 1,479 Bosniaks (2.83 per cent), 440 Albanians (0.84 per cent), 357 Slovenians (0.68 per cent).

City of Pula: Population trends 1857–2021
v

population	3628	10601	25390	31498	36143	59498	38591	44219	20812	28259	37099	47156	56153	62378	58594	57460	52220
	1857	1869	1880	1890	1900	1910	1921	1931	1948	1953	1961	1971	1981	1991	2001	2011	2021

Sources: Croatian Bureau of Statistics publications

== Sights ==
The city is best known for its many surviving ancient Roman buildings, the most famous of which is its 1st-century amphitheatre, which is among the six largest surviving Roman arenas in the world and locally known as the Arena. This is one of the best-preserved amphitheatres from antiquity and is still in use today during summer film festivals. During the World War II Italian fascist administration, there were attempts to dismantle the arena and move it to mainland Italy, which were quickly abandoned due to the costs involved.

Two other notable and well-preserved ancient Roman structures are the 1st-century BC triumphal arch, the Arch of the Sergii and the co-eval Temple of Augustus, built in the 1st century AD on the forum during the reign of the Roman emperor Augustus.

The Twin Gates (Porta Gemina) is one of the few remaining gates after the city walls were pulled down at the beginning of the 19th century. It dates from the mid-2nd century, replacing an earlier gate. It consists of two arches, columns, a plain architrave, and a decorated frieze. Closeby are a few remains of the old city wall.

The Gate of Hercules dates from the 1st century. At the top of the single arch, one can see the bearded head of Hercules, carved in high-relief, and his club on the adjoining voussoir. A damaged inscription, close to the club, contains the names of Lucius Calpurnius Piso and Gaius Cassius Longinus who were entrusted by the Roman senate to found a colony at the site of Pula. Thus it can be deduced that Pula was founded between 47 and 44 BC.

The Augustan Forum was constructed in the 1st century BC, close to the sea. In Roman times it was surrounded by temples of Jupiter, Juno and Minerva. This Roman commercial and administrative centre of the city remained the main square of classical and medieval Pula. It is still the main administrative and legislative centre of the city. The temple of Augustus is still preserved today. A part of the back wall of the temple of Juno was integrated into the Communal Palace in the 13th century.

Two Roman theatres have withstood the ravages of time: the smaller one (diameter c. 50 m; 2nd century AD) near the centre, the larger one (diameter c. 100 m; 1st century AD) on the southern edge of the city.

The city's old quarter of narrow streets, lined with Medieval and Renaissance buildings, are still surfaced with ancient Roman paving stones.

The Byzantine chapel of Santa Maria del Canneto (or St. Mary Formosa) was built in the 6th century (before 546) in the form of a Greek cross, resembling the churches in Ravenna. It was built by Maximianus of Ravenna, then a deacon, but later Archbishop of Ravenna. It was, together with another chapel, part of a Benedictine abbey that was demolished in the 16th century. The floors and the walls are decorated with 6th-century mosaics. The decoration bears some resemblance to the Mausoleum of Galla Placidia in Ravenna. The wall over the door contains a Byzantine carved stone panel. The 15th-century wall paintings may be restorations of Early Christian paintings. When the Venetians raided Pula in 1605, they removed many treasures from this chapel and took them to Venice, including the four columns of oriental alabaster that stand behind the high altar of St Mark's Basilica.

The Cathedral of the Assumption of the Blessed Virgin Mary was built in the 6th century, when Pula became the seat of a bishopry, over the remains of the original site where the Christians used to gather and pray in Roman times. It was enlarged in the 10th century. After its destruction by Genoese and Venetian raids, it was almost completely rebuilt in the 15th century. It got its present form when a late Renaissance façade was added in the early 16th century. The church still retains several Romanesque and Byzantine characters, such as some parts of the walls (dating from the 4th century), a few of the original column capitals and the upper windows of the nave. In the altar area and in the room to the south one can still see fragments of 5th- or 6th-century floor mosaics with memorial inscriptions from worshippers who paid for the mosaics. The windows of the aisles underwent reconstruction in Gothic style after a fire in 1242. The belfry in front of the church was built between 1671 and 1707 using stones from the amphitheatre. There also used to stand a baptistery from the 5th century in front of the church, but it was demolished in 1885.

The Orthodox Church of St. Nicholas with its Ravenna-style polygonal apse originally dates from the 6th century, but was partially rebuilt in the 10th century. In 1583 it was assigned to the Orthodox community of Pula, mainly immigrants from Cyprus and Nauplion. The church owns several icons from the 15th and the 16th century and an iconostasis from the Greek artists Tomios Batos from the 18th century.

The star-shaped castle with four bastions is situated on top of the central hill of the old city. It was built, over the remains of the Roman capitolium, by the Venetians in the 17th century, following the plans of the French military architect Antoine de Ville. Since 1961 it houses the Historical Museum of Istria. Close by, on the north-eastern slopes, one can see the remains of a 2nd-century theatre.

The Church of St. Francis dates from the end of the 13th century. It was built in 1314 in the late Romanesque style with Gothic additions such as the rose window. The church consists of a single nave with three apses. An unusual feature of this church is the double pulpit, with one part projecting into the street. A 15th-century wooden polyptych from an Emilian artist adorns the altar. The west portal is decorated with shell motifs and a rose window. The adjoining monastery dates from the 14th century. The cloisters display some antique Roman artefacts.

The Archaeological Museum of Istria is situated in the park on a lower level than the Roman theatre and close to the Twin Gates. Its collection was started by Marshall Marmont in August 1802 when he collected the stone monuments from the temple of Augustus. The present-day museum was opened in 1949. It displays treasures from Pula and surroundings from prehistory until the Middle Ages. The building was constructed under Austro-Hungarian rule and was the former k.u.k. Staatsgymnasium, the Austrian high school. The Aquarium Pula is the biggest aquarium in Croatia, located in the Austro-Hungarian fortress Verudela, which was built in 1886 on the peninsula 3 km (2 mi) from the centre of the city of Pula. Transforming the fortress into the aquarium has been in progress since 2002. The installation encompasses about 60 tanks on the ground floor, the moat, and the first floor of the fortress. In an area of approximately 2,000 m^{2} (21,528 sq ft), visitors can view inhabitants of the Northern and Southern Adriatic Sea, tropical marine and freshwater fish, and representatives of European rivers and lakes. From the roof of the fort, visitors may view the entire city of Pula. It is also possible to see the first marine turtle rescue centre in Croatia.

Fort Bourguignon is one of many fortresses in Pula that the Austrian empire erected to protect the port for its navy.

Nesactium is an ancient hill fort settlement, which is considered to be the oldest urban settlement in Istria. The town is settled about 10 km north of Pula, next to Valtura and Pula Airport. The site itself is located above Bay of Budava, and it is well protected by its steep hills. Nesactium is first mentioned as the main settlement of the Histri, the oldest people on the peninsula, which was the eponym for Istria. Livy was the first who mentioned Nesactium, and the altar dedicated to Emperor Gordian from the 3rd century, where "Res Republica Nesactiensium" is mentioned, confirmed the actual existence of this city. The search for the city began in 1900, when Pietro Kandler first put together the toponym Vizače with ancient Nesactium.

As a result of its rich political history, Pula is a city with a cultural mixture of people and languages from the Mediterranean and Central Europe, ancient and contemporary. Pula's architecture reflects these layers of history. Residents are commonly fluent in both Croatian and Italian but also in foreign languages like German and English. From 30 October 1904 to March 1905 Irish writer James Joyce taught English at the Berlitz School; his students were mainly Austro-Hungarian naval officers who were stationed at the Naval Shipyard. While he was in Pola he organised the local printing of his broadsheet The Holy Office, which satirised both William Butler Yeats and George William Russell.

=== Fortifications ===
- Fort Munide
- Fort Grosso
- Fort Punta Christo
- Flank Battery Zoncia
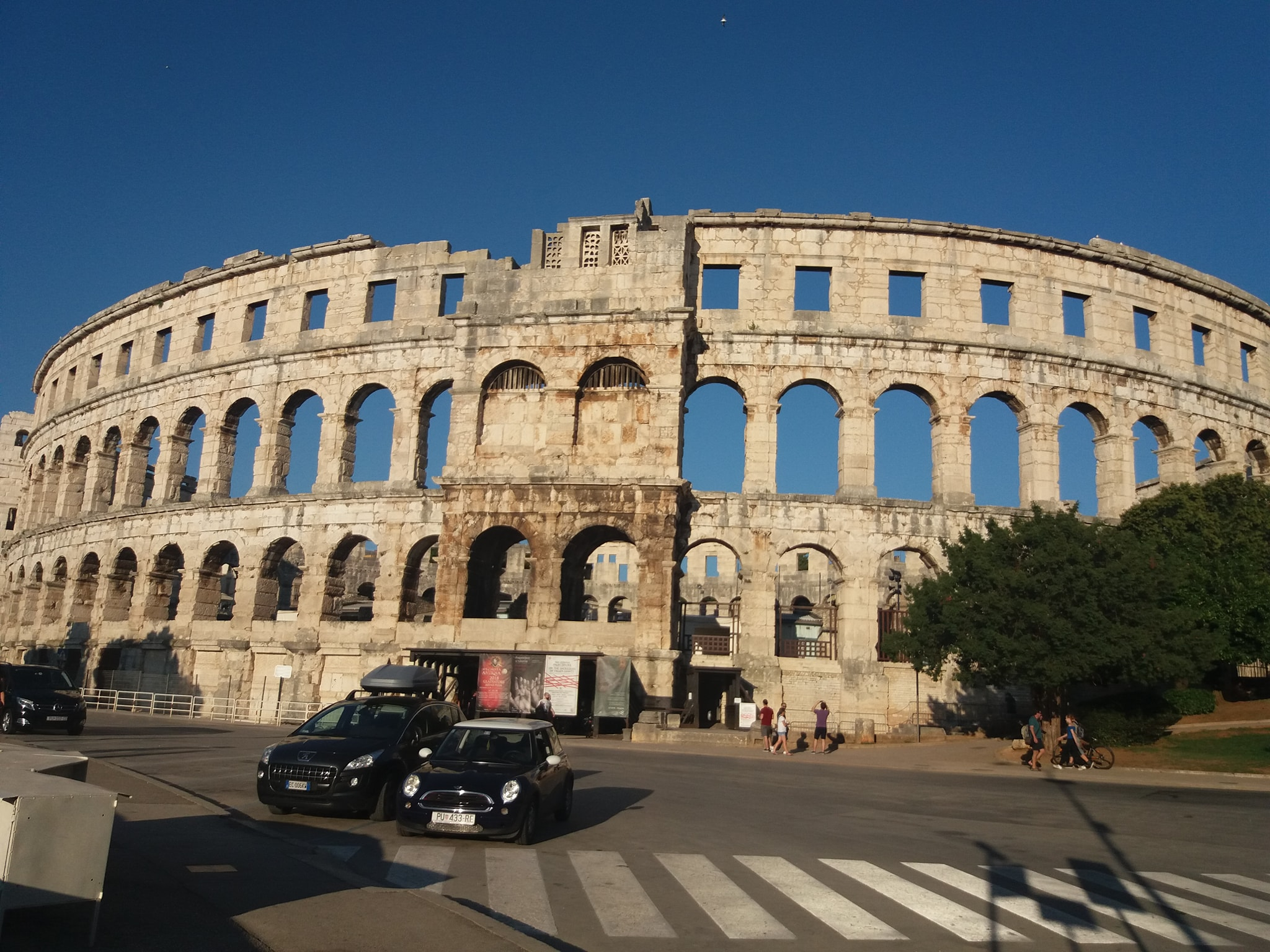
Pula Arena (exterior)

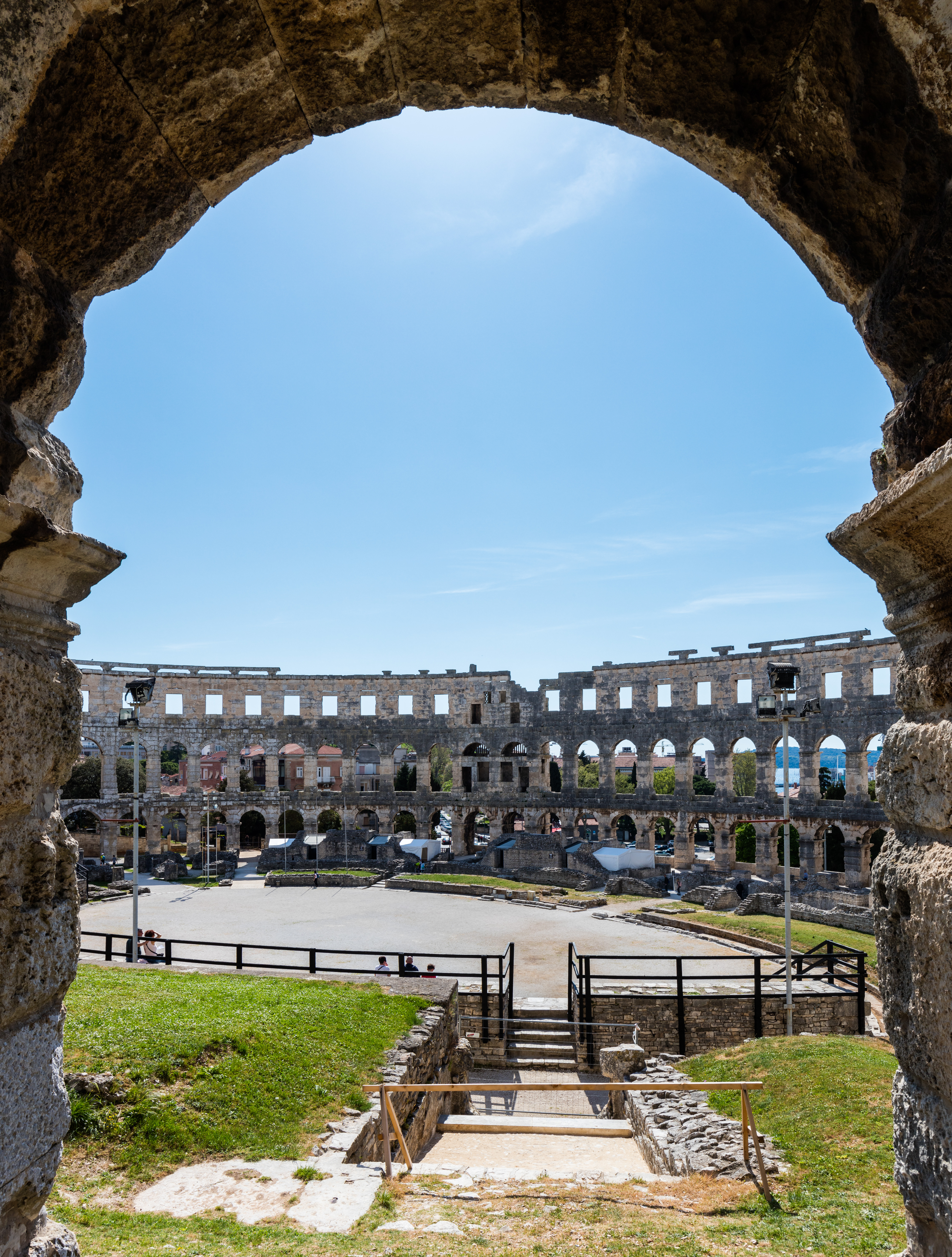
Pula Arena (interior)

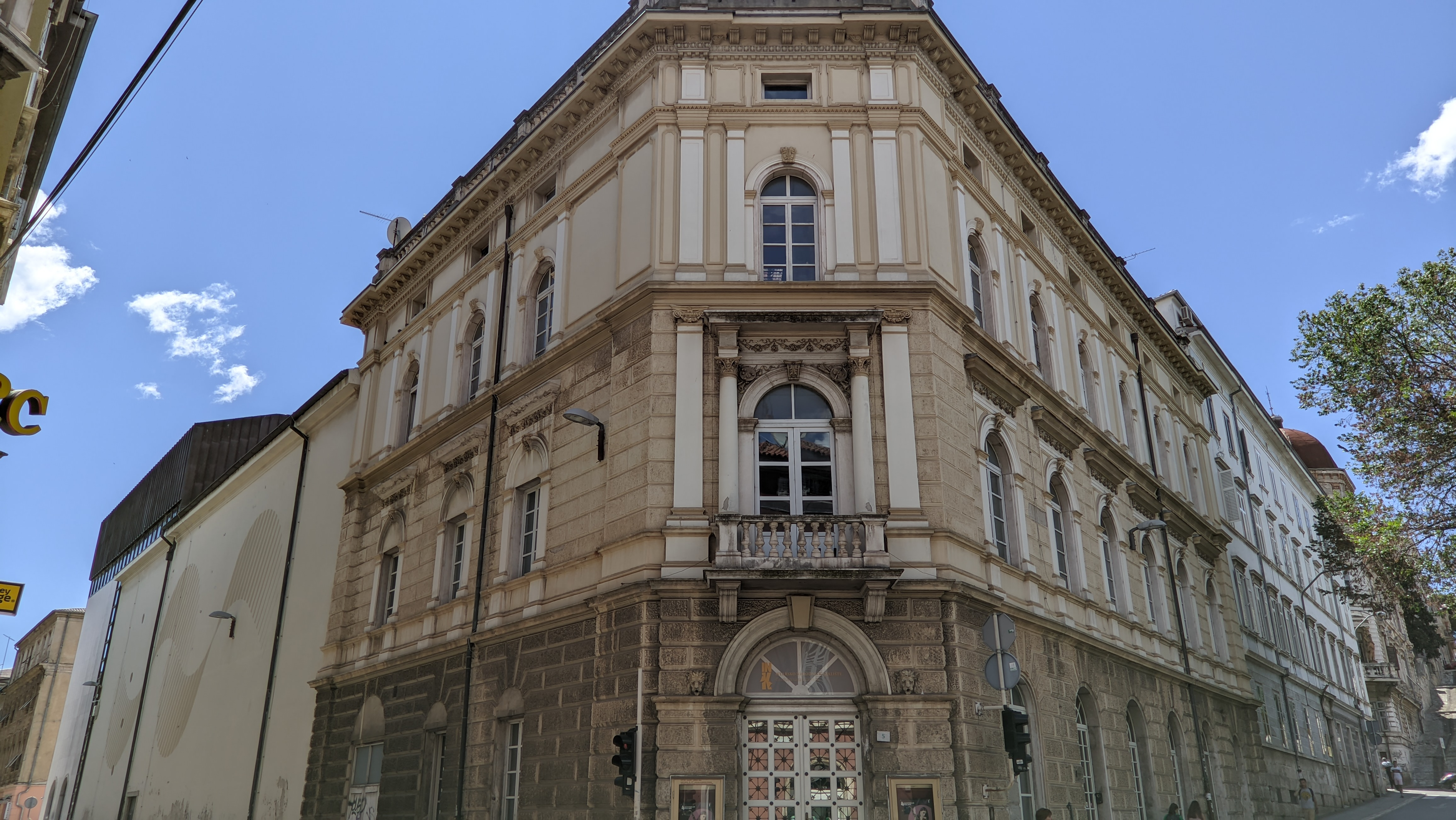
Istrian National Theatre

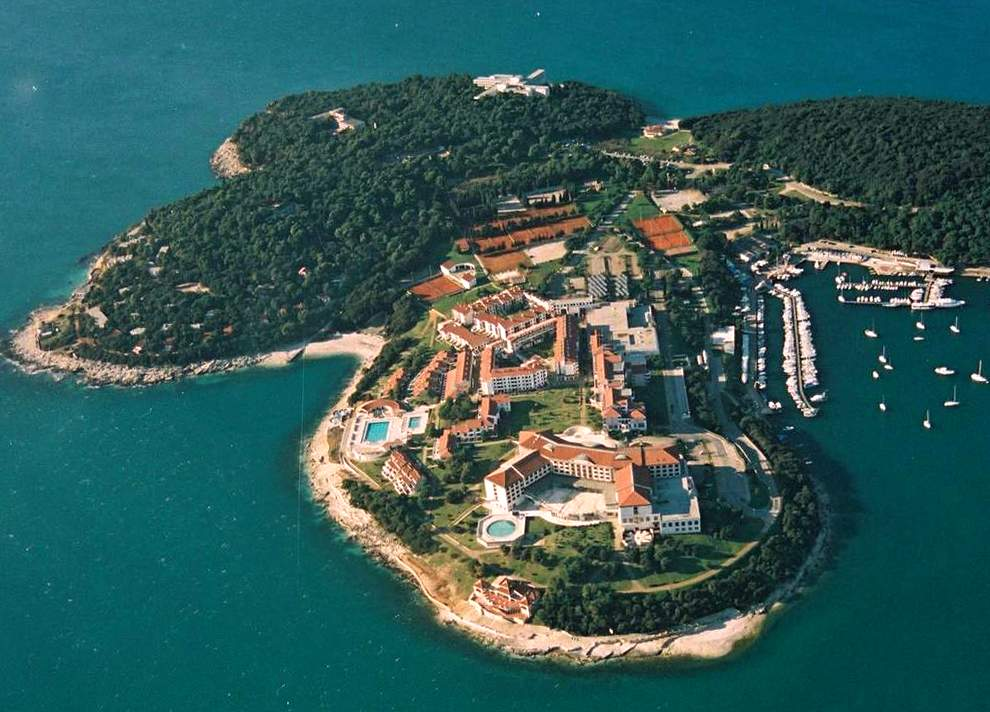
Punta Verudela

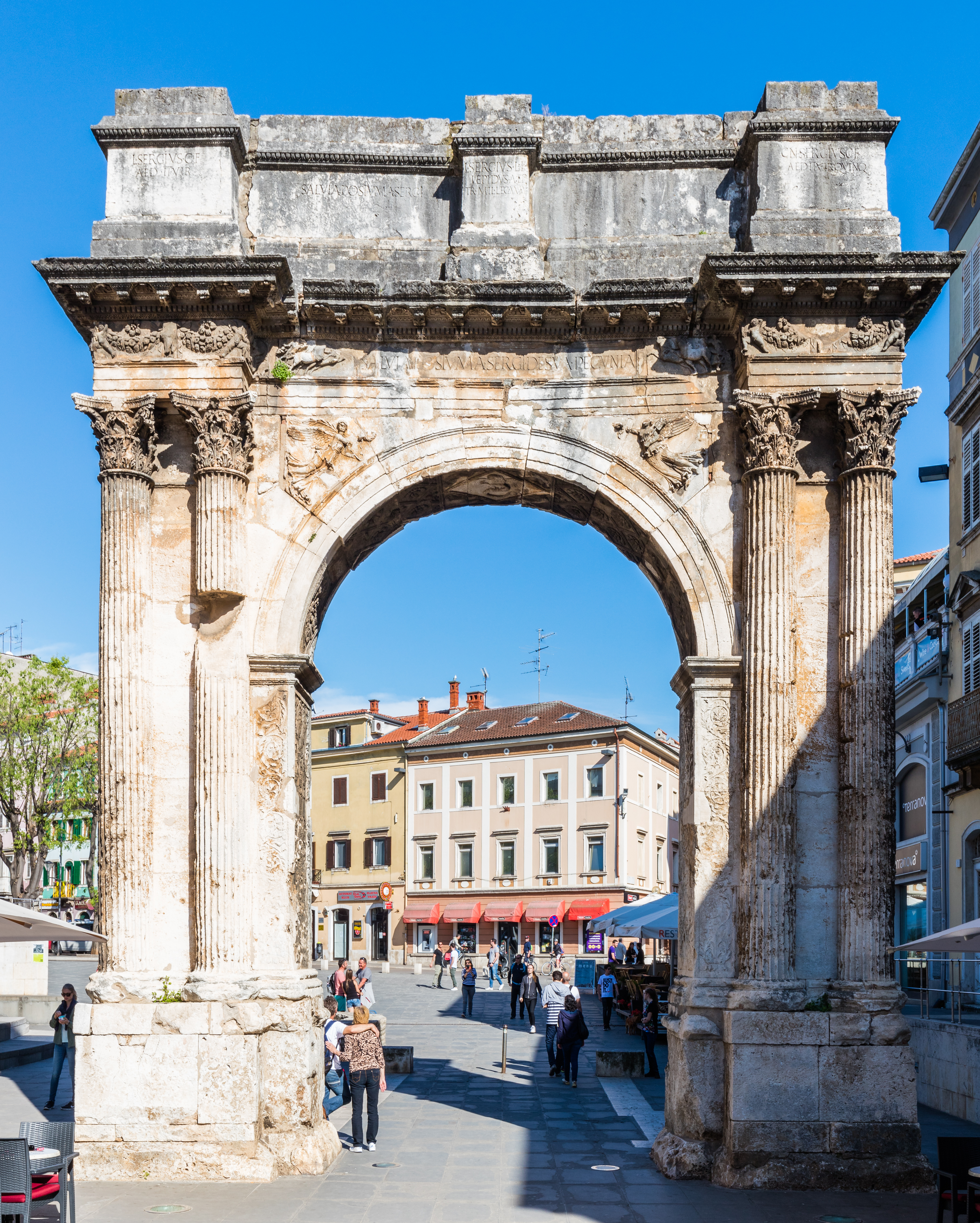
Arch of Sergii

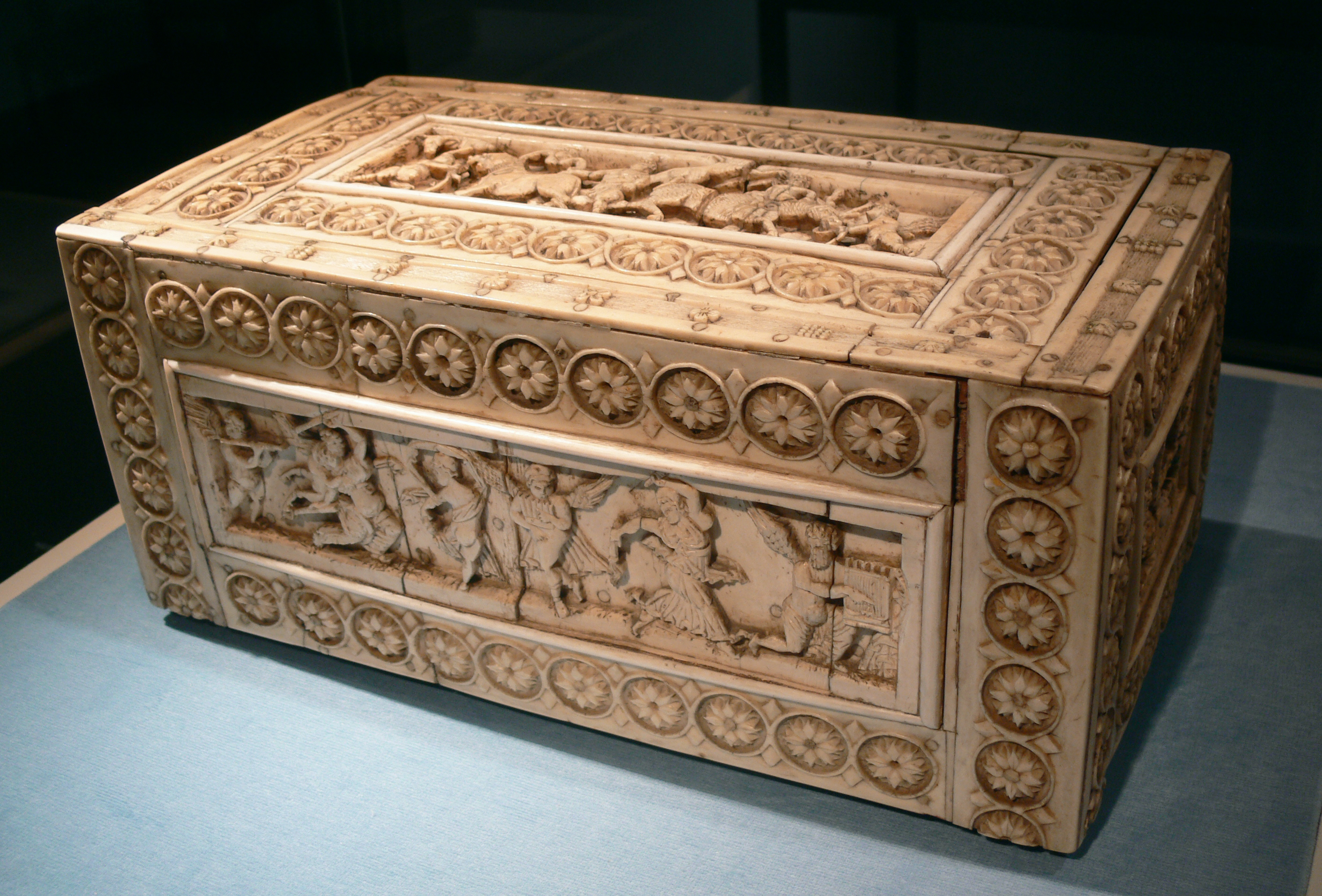
Byzantine Piran Reliquary at the Archaeological Museum of Istria

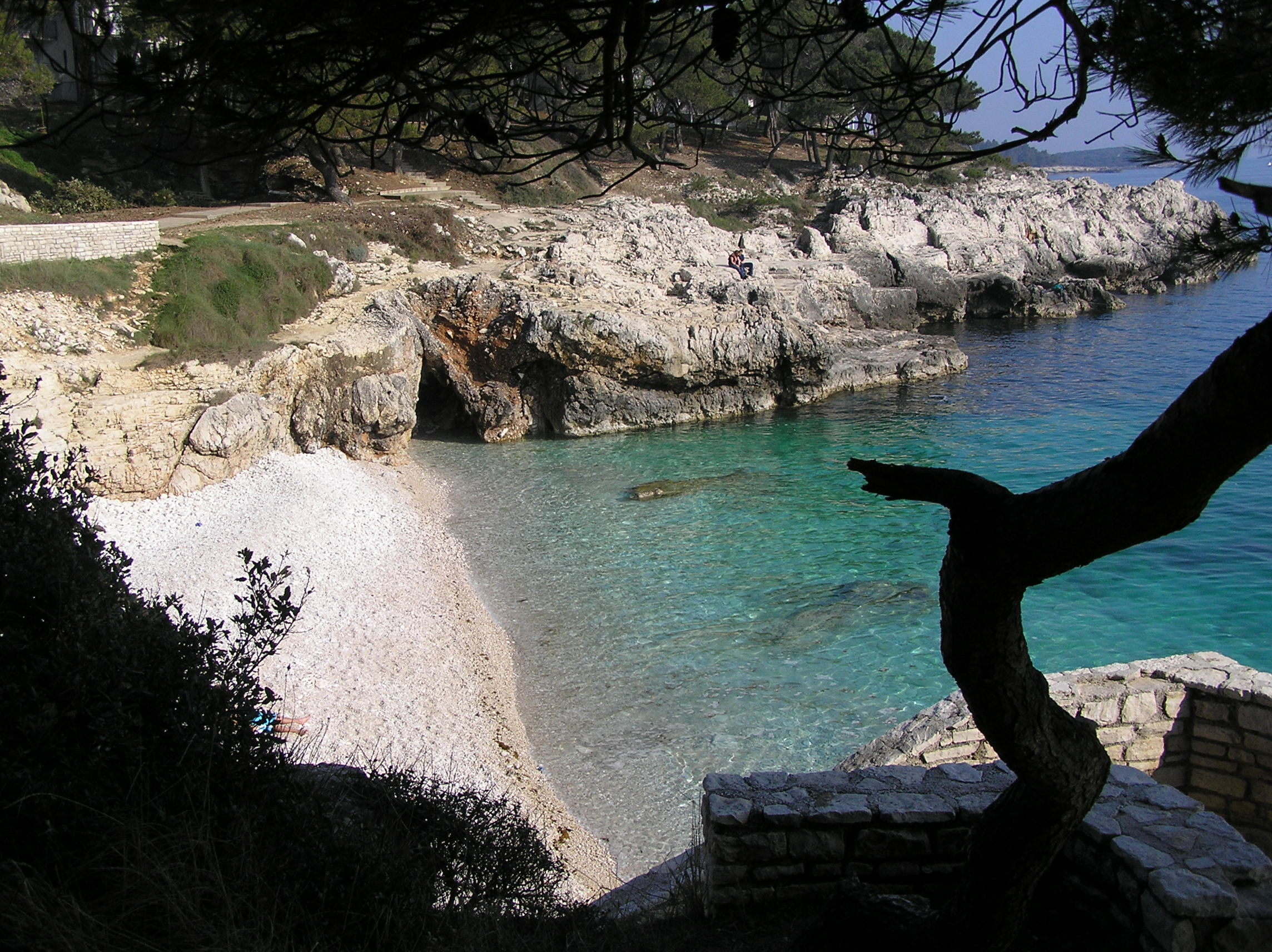
Lungo Mare beach

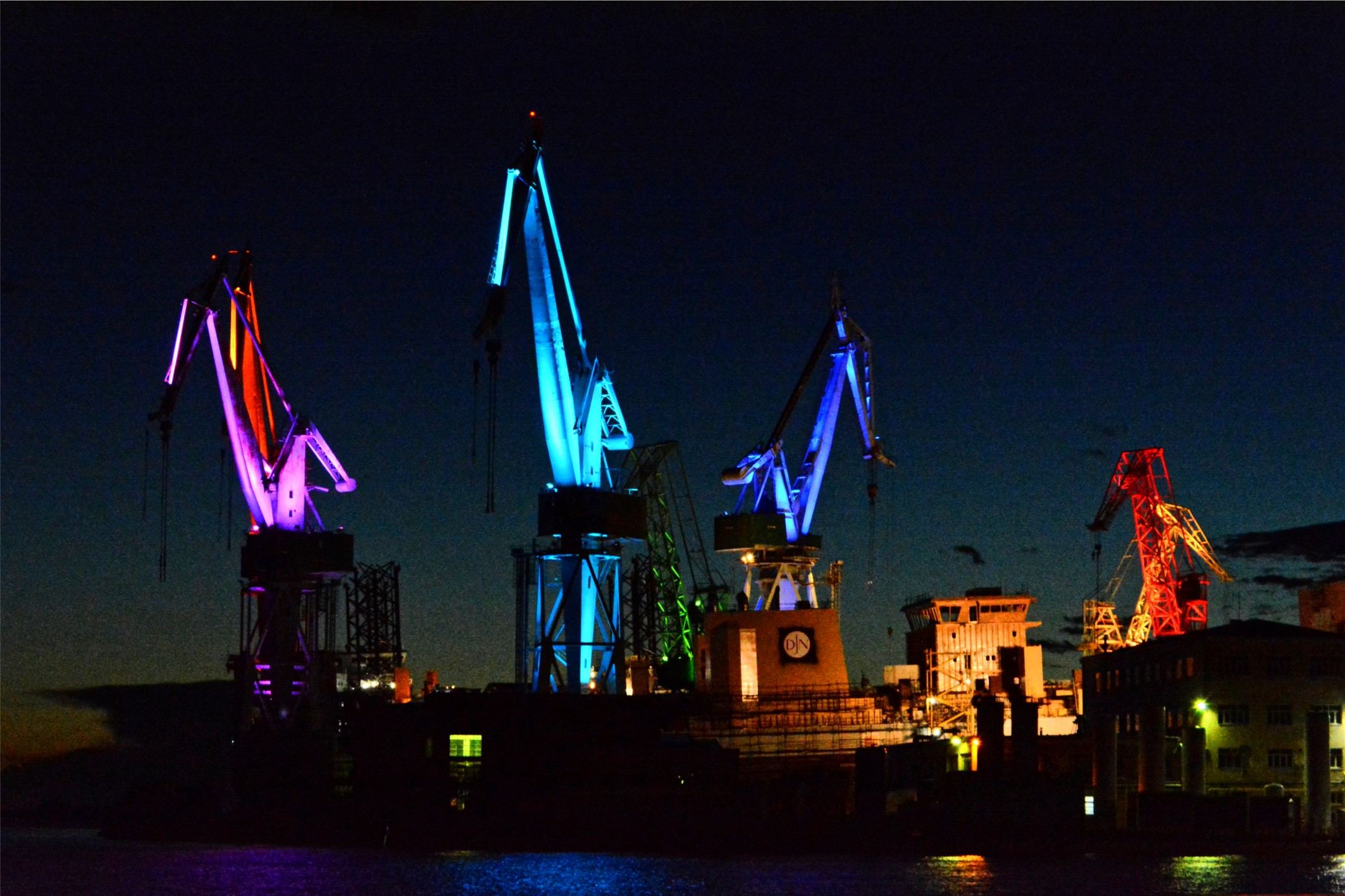
Light design by Dean Skira on cranes in Pula harbour

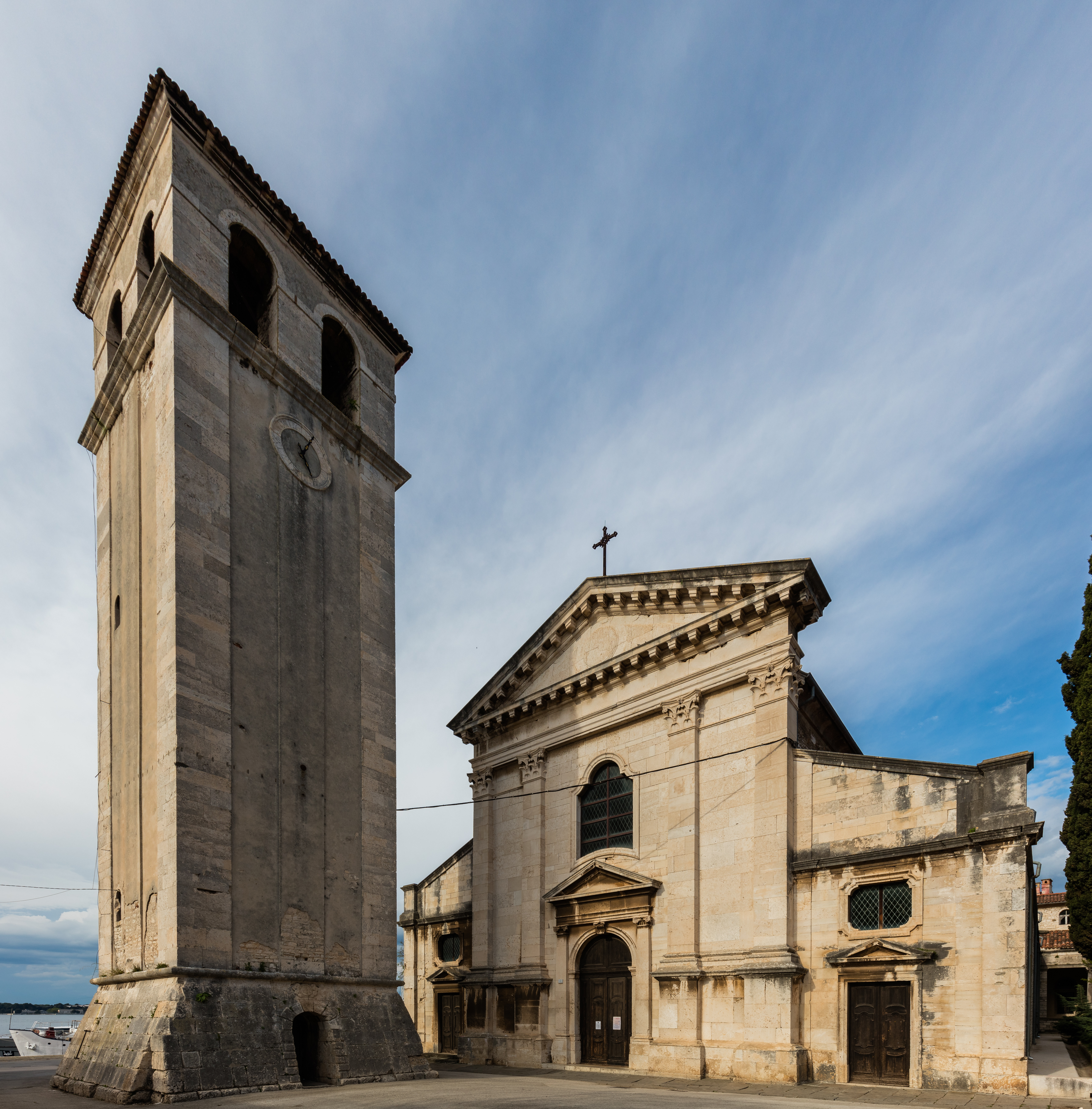
Pula Cathedral

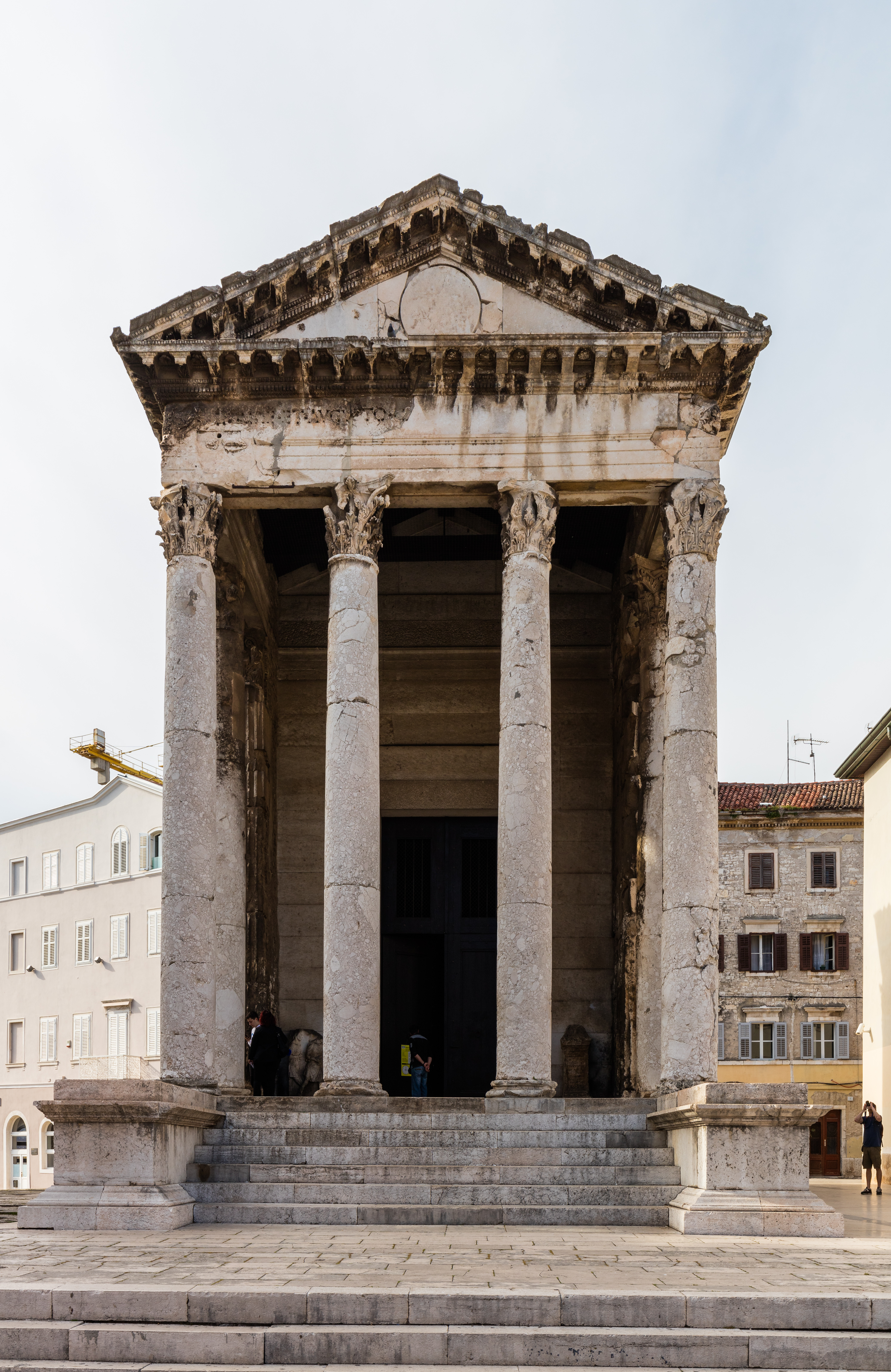
The Temple of Augustus

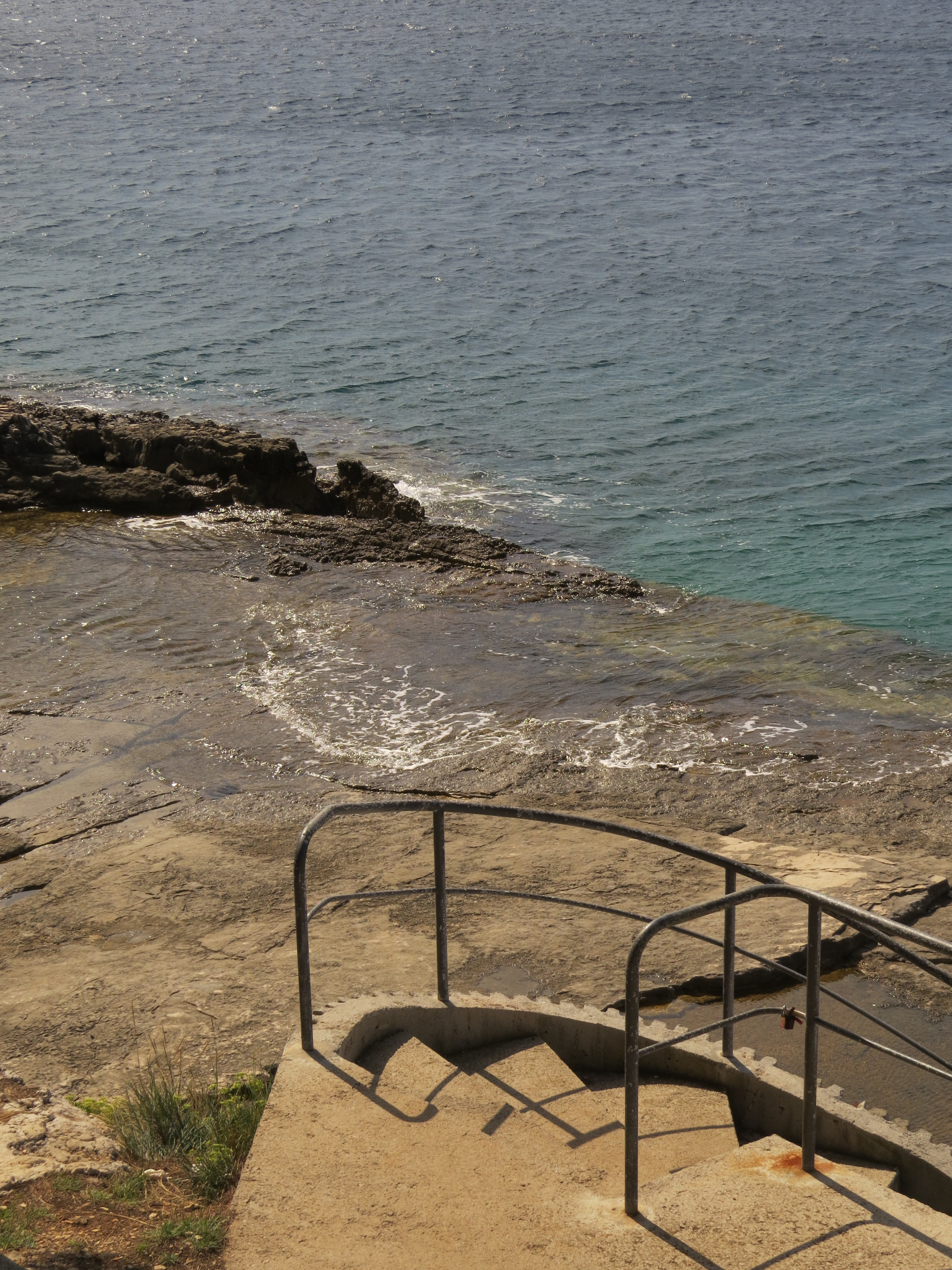
Sea and outdoor staircase

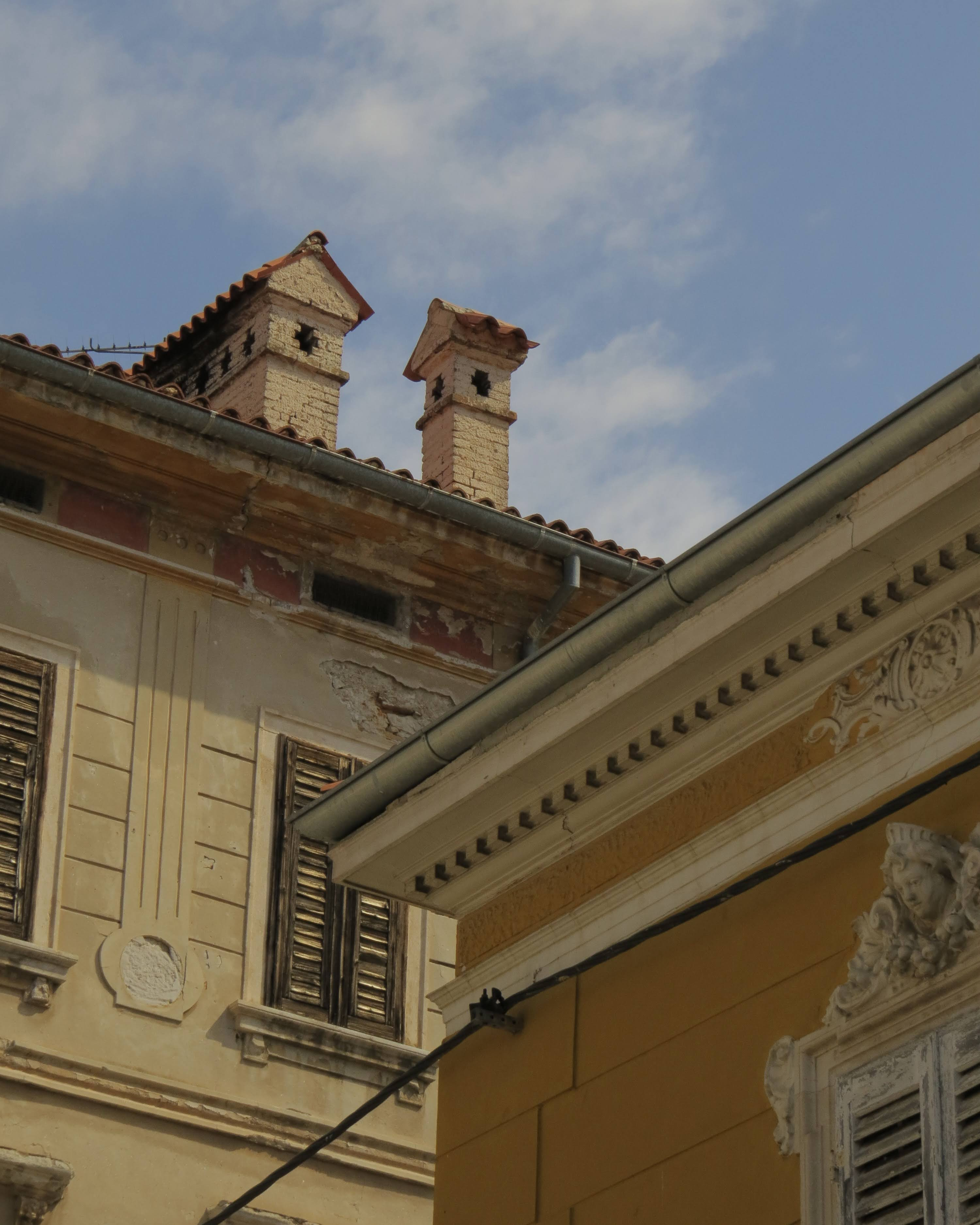
Apartment buildings

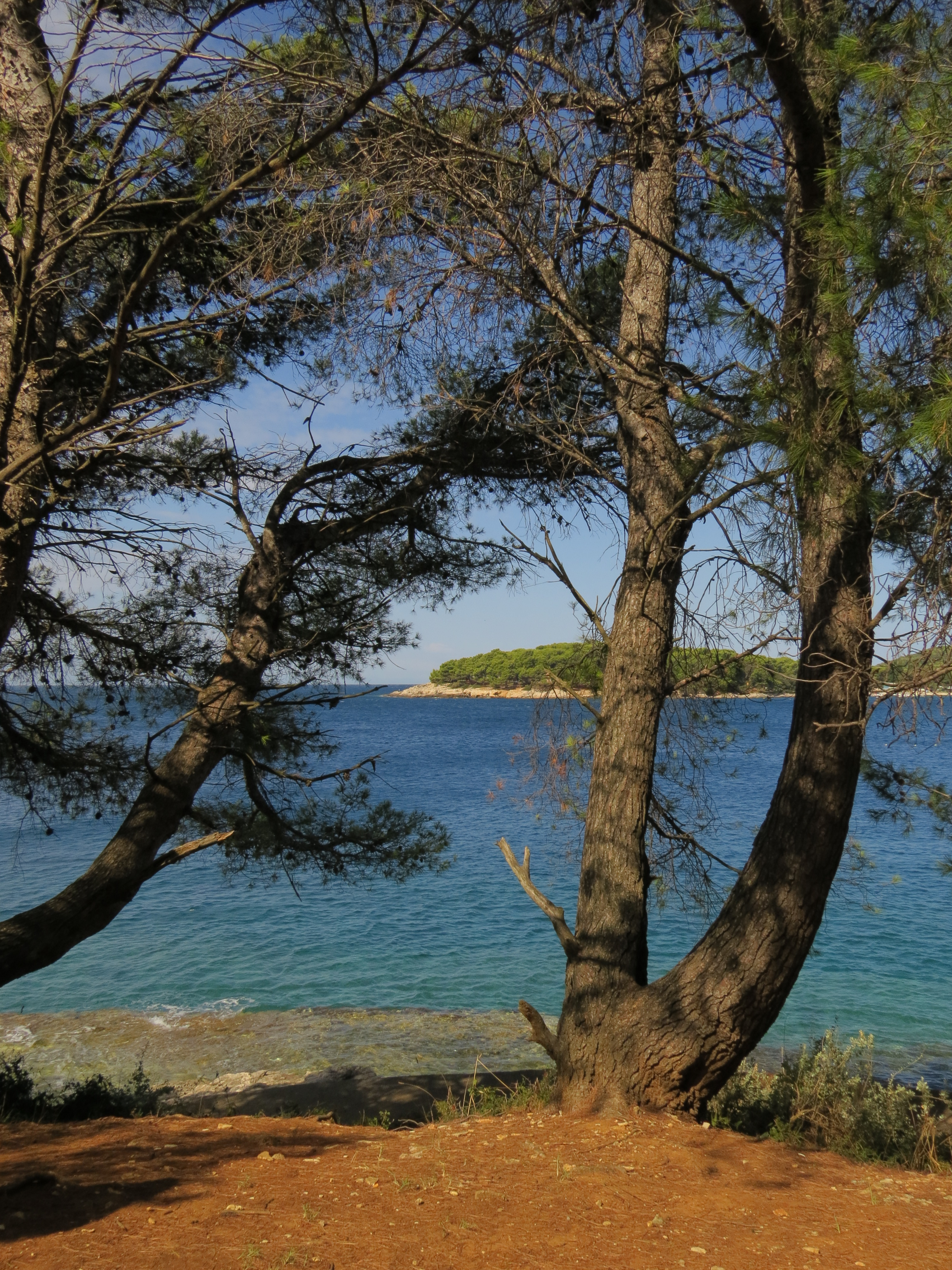
Trees and sea

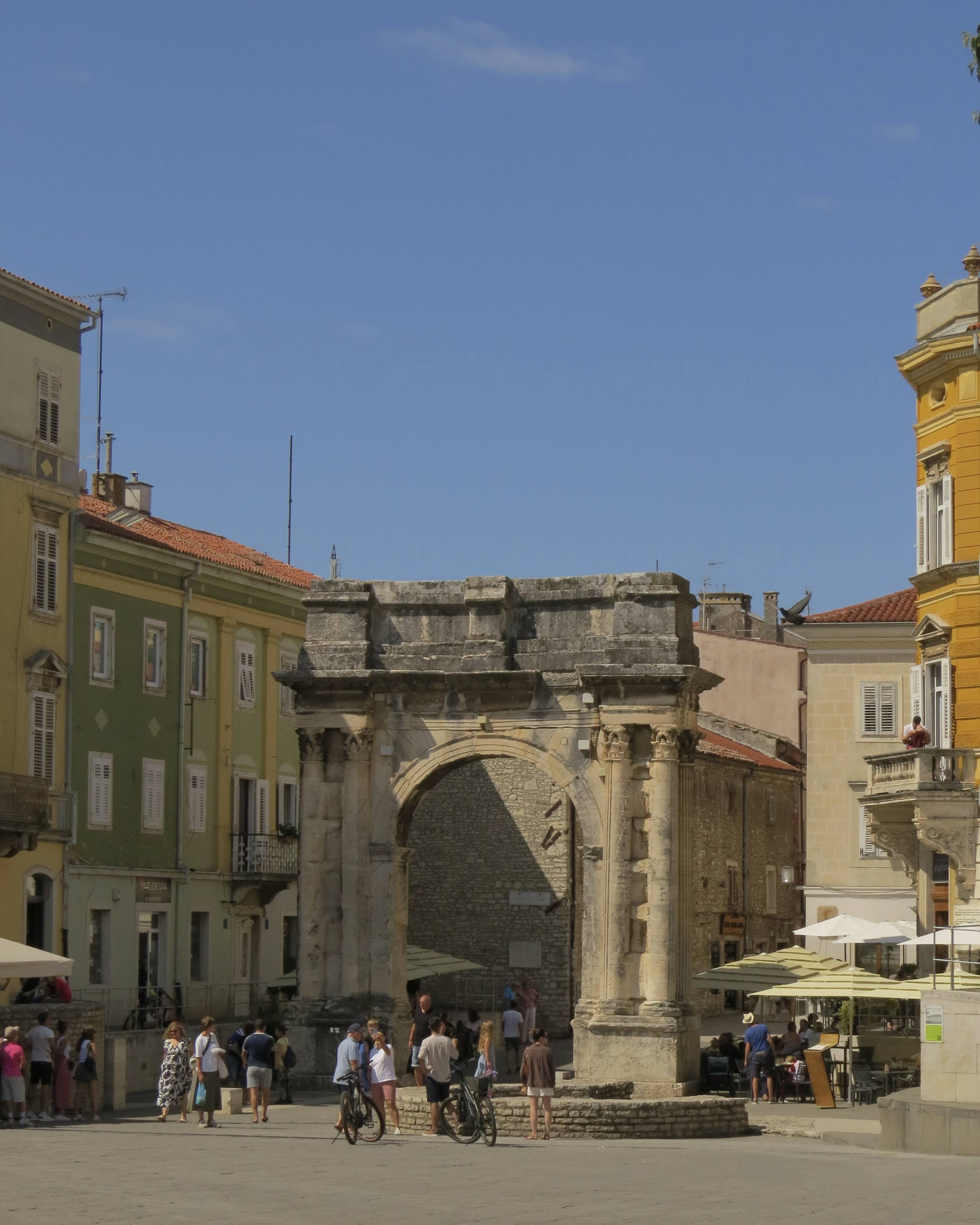
Arch of Sergii and surrounding buildings

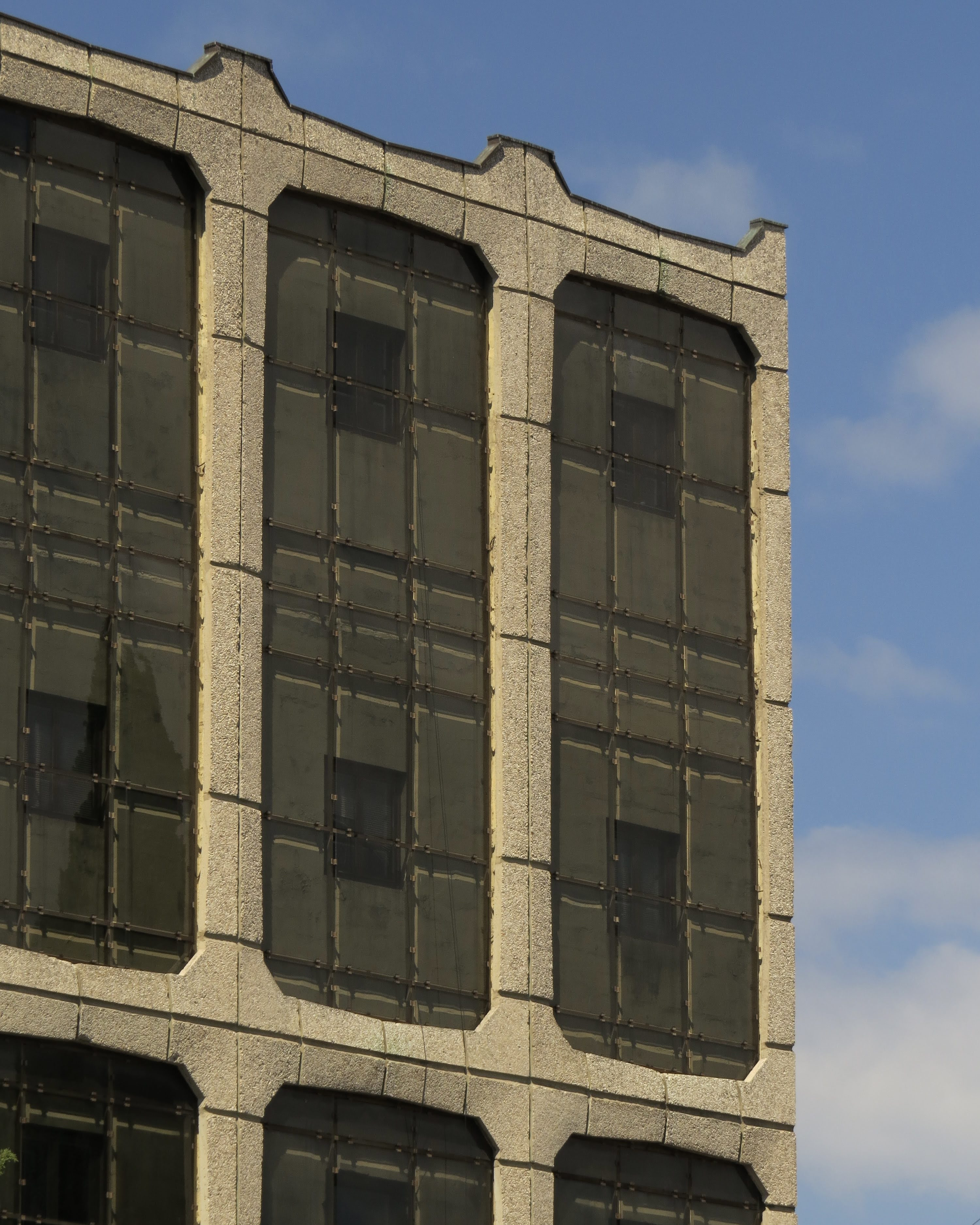
Corner of the Telephone and Telegraph Center

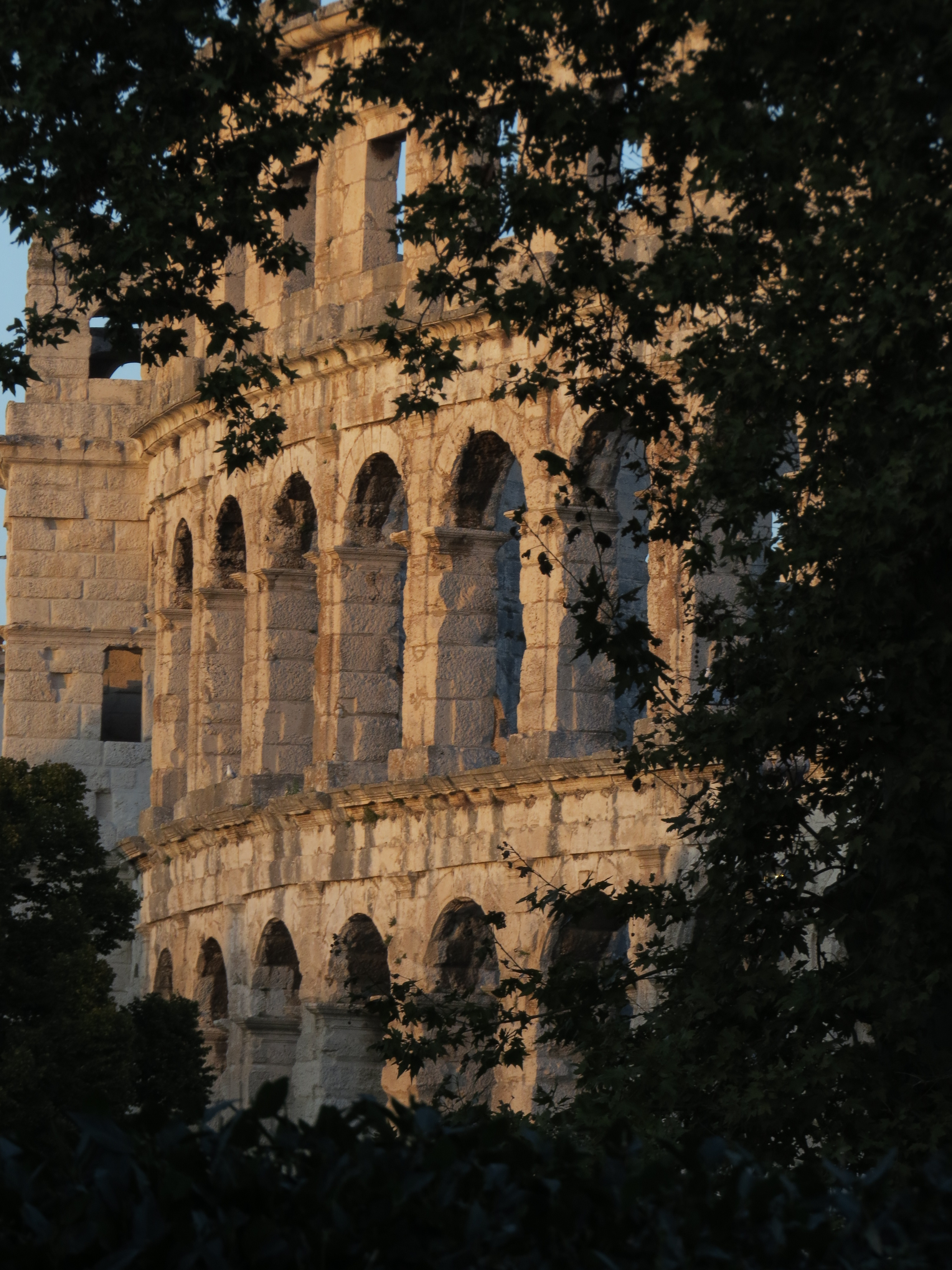
Arena

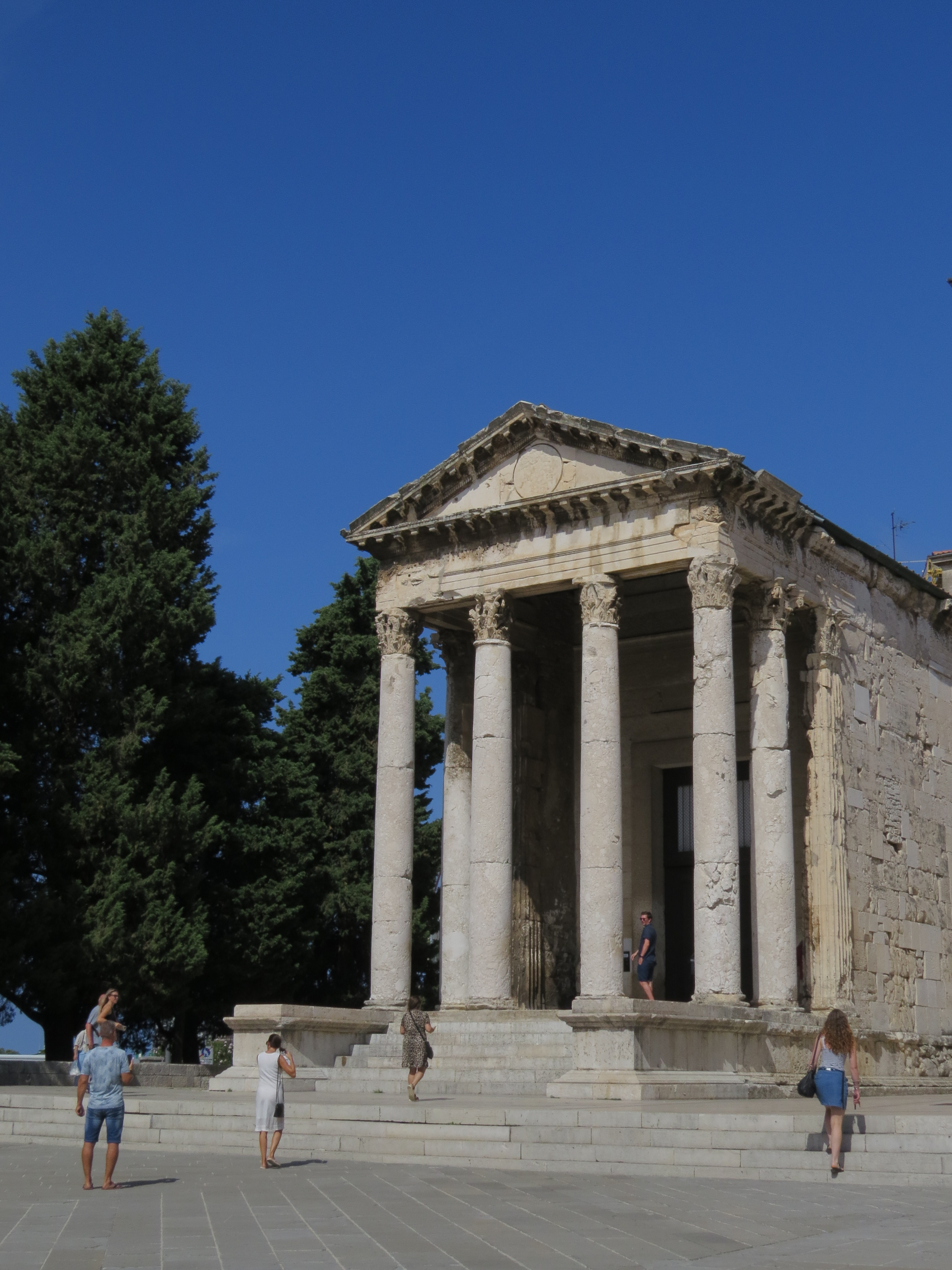
Temple of Augustus

== Tourism ==
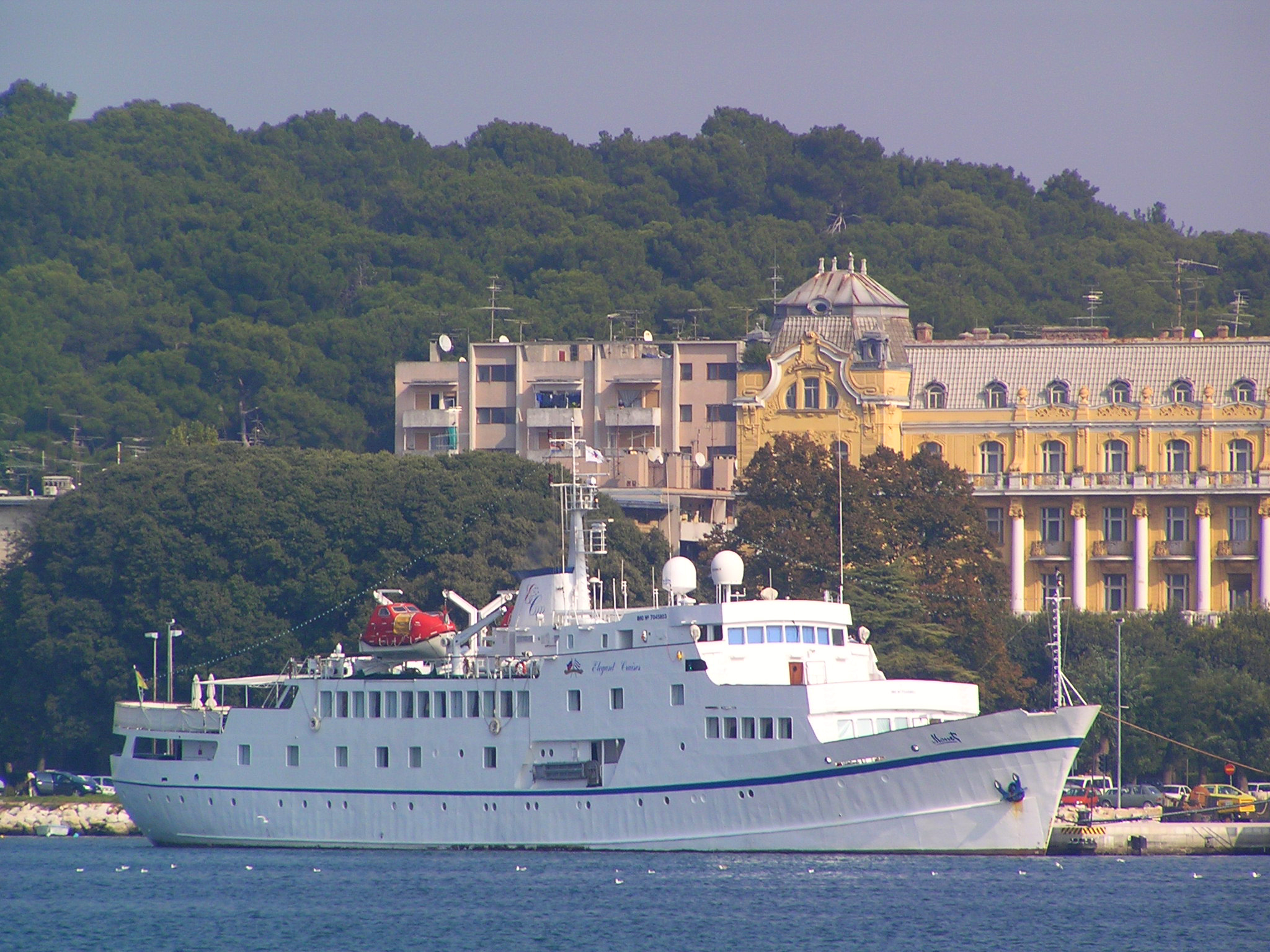
Riviera Hotel (right)

Pula's surrounding natural environment, countryside and the turquoise water of the Adriatic have made the city popular summer holiday destination. The pearl nearby is Brioni island or Brijuni national park visited by numerous world leaders since it was the summer residence of Josip Broz Tito. Roman villas and temples still lie buried among farm fields and along the shoreline of the dozens of surrounding fishing and farming villages. The coastal waters offer beaches, fishing, wreck dives to ancient Roman galleys and World War I warships, cliff diving, and sailing to unspoiled coves and islands large and small.

Pula is the end point of the EuroVelo 9 cycle route that runs from Gdańsk on the Baltic Sea through Poland, the Czech Republic, Austria, Slovenia and Croatia.

It is possible to track dinosaur footprints on the nearby seashores; certain more important finds have been made at an undisclosed location near Bale.

== Transport ==
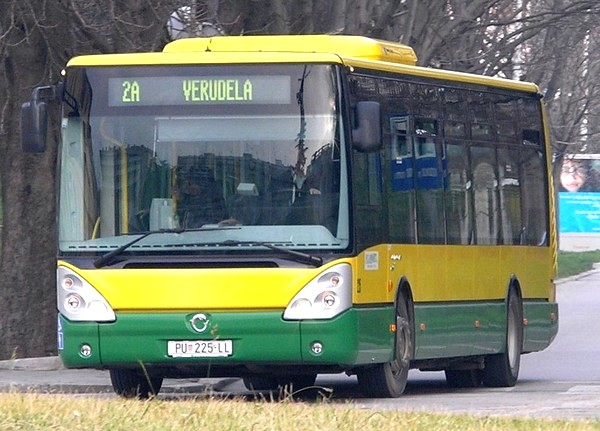
Pulapromet city bus

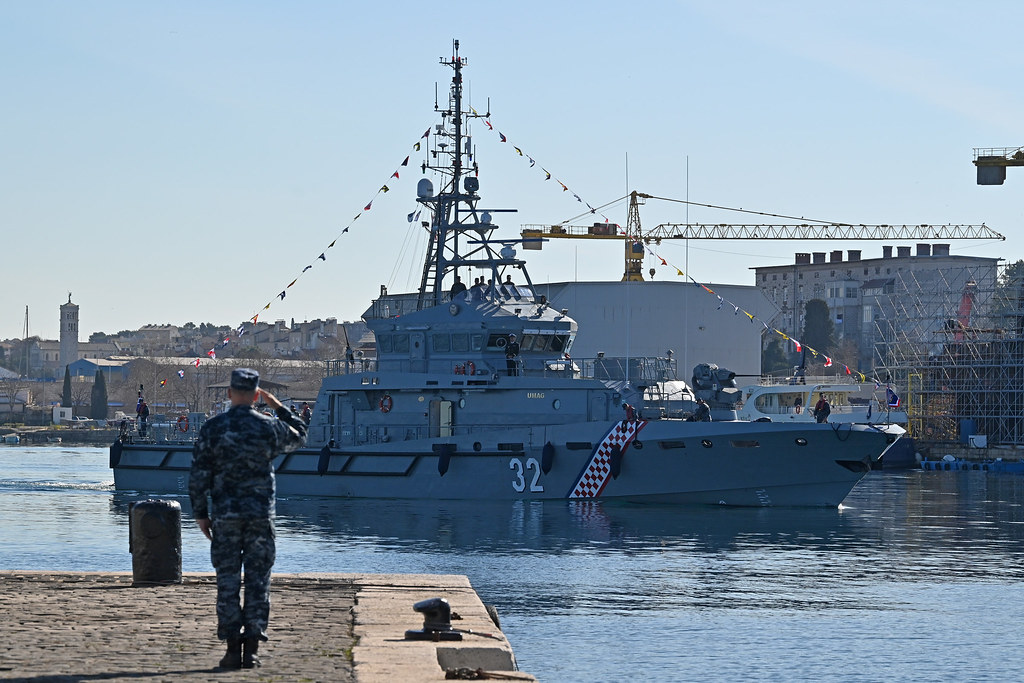
Croatian Coast Guard at the port of Pula

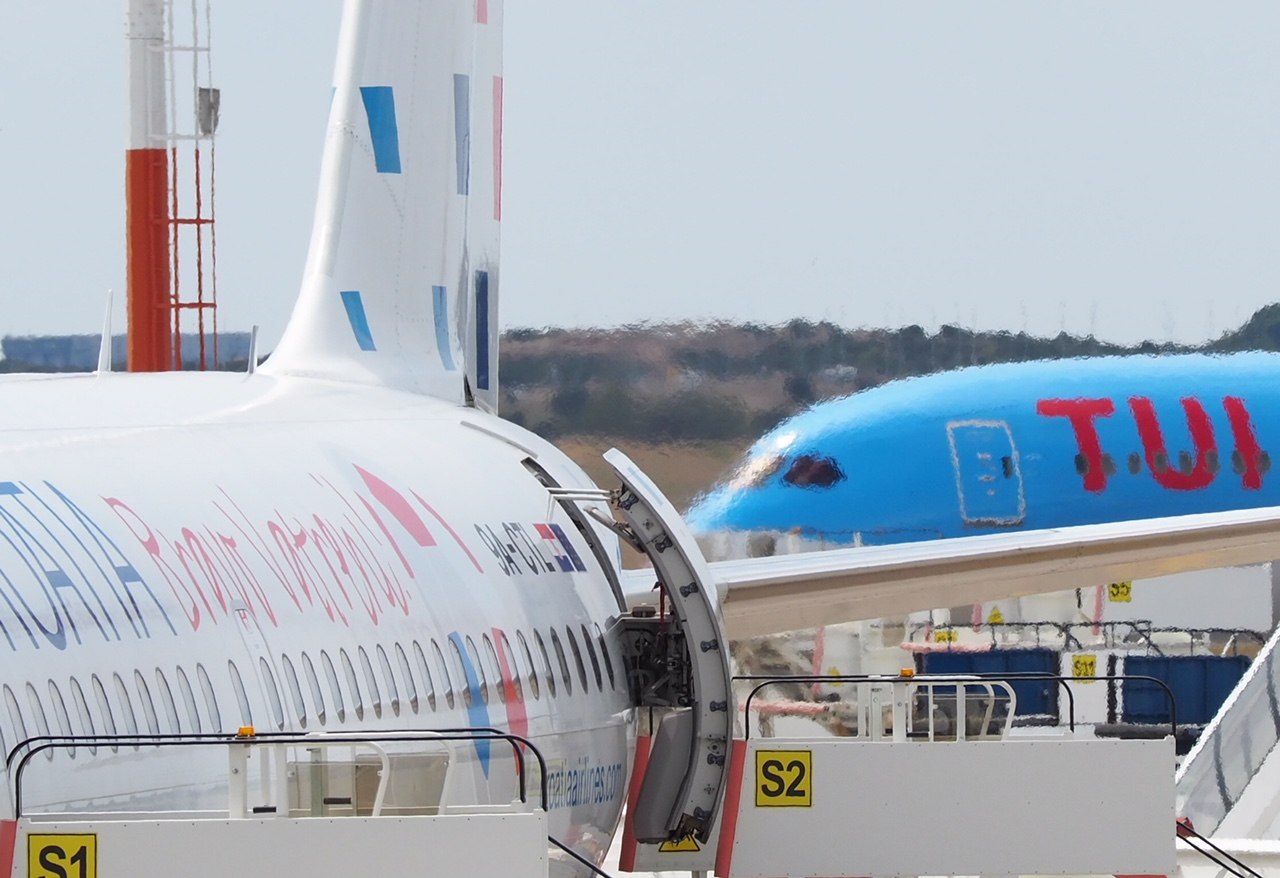
Pula Airport

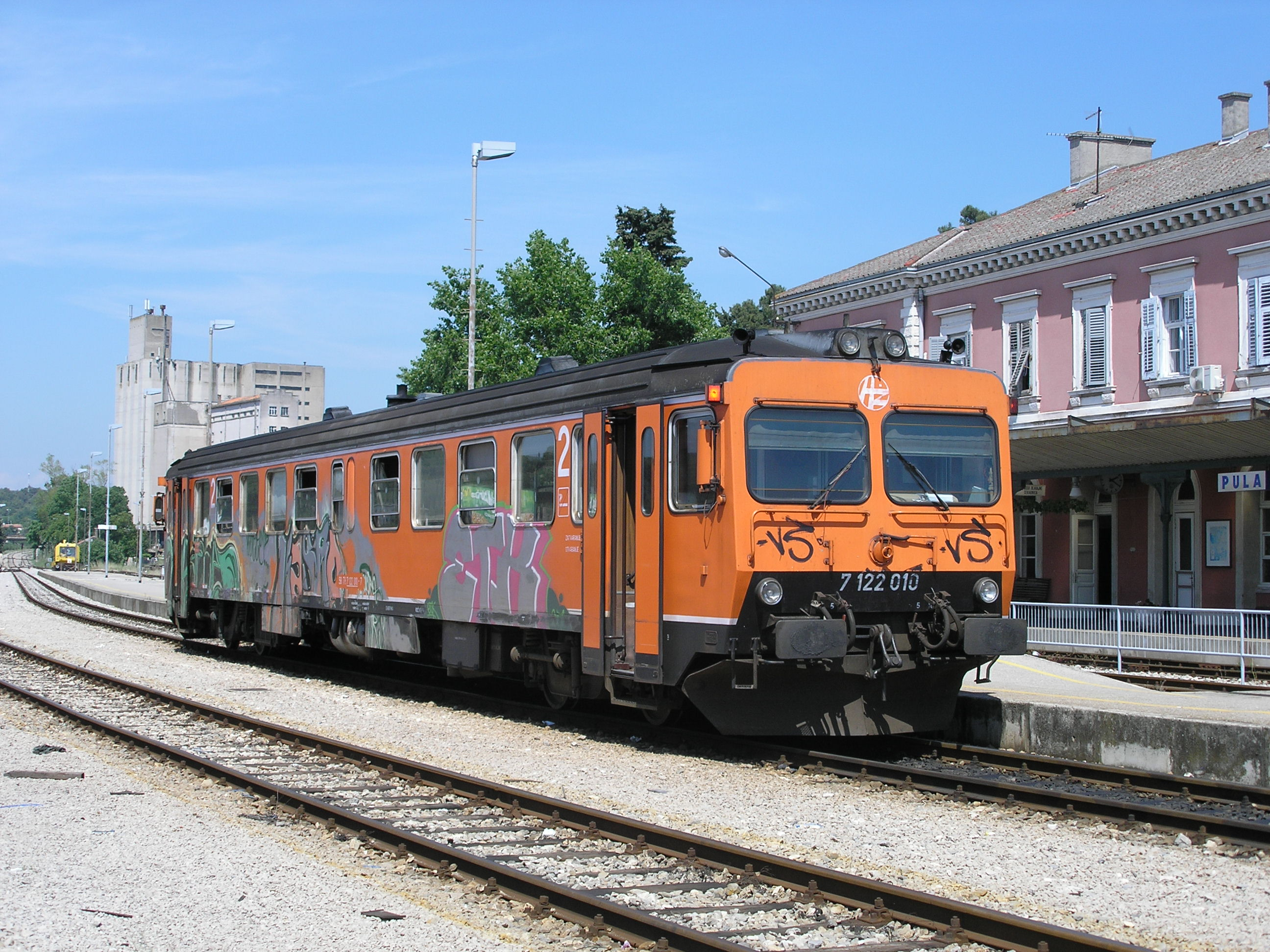
HŽ 7122 train in Pula

=== Trams ===
Pula had an electric tramway system in the early 20th century. It was built in 1904 as a part of Pula's economic crescendo during the Austro-Hungarian rule. After World War I, during the Fascist rule, the need for tram transportation declined and it was finally dismantled in 1934, and public transportation was taken over by the "Gattoni" bus company.

In 2021, funds were secured for the initial phase of a new tram system in Pula which would travel roughly from the train station to Pragrande via the waterfront, including using existing infrastructure where possible.

=== Pula Airport ===
Pula Airport is located north-east of Pula, and serves both domestic and international destinations. Similarly to nearby Rijeka Airport, it is not a major international destination, and in 2025 it was fifth busiest airport in Croatia. However, this has changed over recent years as low-cost airline Ryanair started scheduled flights to Pula in November 2006. Easyjet offers many flights to UK airports. Jet2 also offers flights from Newcastle, Birmingham, Glasgow, Leeds-Bradford, Belfast, Manchester, and East Midlands Airports. Scandinavian Airlines (SAS) operates scheduled flights from Stockholm and Copenhagen during summertime. Nearby international airports include Trieste, Zagreb and Ljubljana. There are direct flights into Pula airport from London during the whole year and several other large airports in Western Europe during summer.

On 9 April 2015 European Coastal Airlines established a daily seaplane service from the downtown seaplane terminal at the city's main waterfront. Destinations as of April 2015 are Rijeka, the island of Rab and Mali Lošinj. The airline ceased operation in 2016.

=== Train ===
A train service operates north from Pula through to Slovenia, however, the line remains disconnected from the rest of the Croatian Railways network. Plans to tunnel the 'missing link' between this line and from Rijeka have existed for many years, and despite work commencing on this project previously, have never seen completion. People traveling to Rijeka or Zagreb by train must get off in Lupoglav and take a bus to Rijeka.

Pula Bus Terminus/Terminal is the main hub for Istria and is located on the edge of town just west of the Amphitheatre. From there, excellent service to a wide range of local, domestic, and international locations is available throughout the year. Several bus companies operate from this Terminus including the local service run by Pulapromet. There is also a guaranteed direct line from Pula to Trieste/Venice, especially into spring/summertime.

Passenger ferries also operate from the port area to nearby islands, and also to Venice and Trieste in Italy from June to September.

== Nearby towns and villages ==
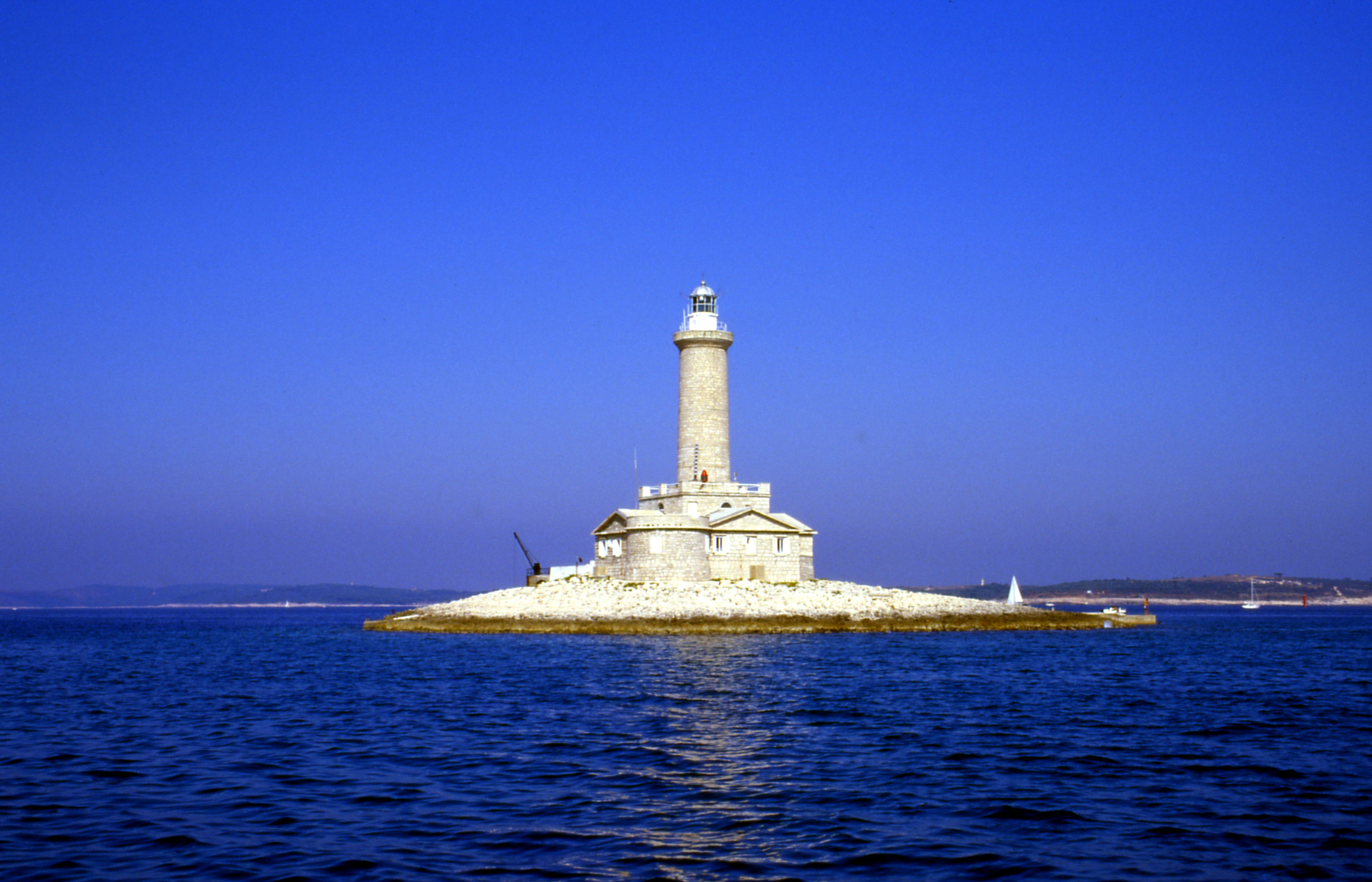
Porer Lightouse

- Bale / Valle
- Banjole / Bagnole
- Barban / Barbana
- Brijuni / Brioni (Isole)
- Fažana / Fasana
- Galižana / Gallesano
- Ližnjan / Lisignano
- Medulin / Medolino
- Pomer / Pomero
- Premantura / Promontore (Capo)
- Šišan / Sissano
- Štinjan / Strugnano
- Valtura / Valtura
- Vinkuran/ Vincurano
- Vodnjan / Dignano

== International relations ==
=== Twin towns – sister cities ===
Pula is twinned with:

Graz, Austria (since 1972, partnership established in 1961); Trier, Germany (since 8 September 1970); Imola, Italy (since 1972); Verona, Italy (since 1982); Čabar, Croatia (since 1974); Kranj, Slovenia (since 1974)	Varaždin, Croatia (since 1979); Novorossiysk, Russia (since 1999); Hekinan, Japan (since 2007); Villefranche-de-Rouergue, France (since 2008); Sarajevo, Bosnia and Herzegovina (since 2012)

Other forms of city partnership

- Szeged, Hungary
- Veles, North Macedonia

Friendly relationships

- Vienna, Austria
- (Austria) several towns from Styria region
- Pécs, Hungary
- Brno, Czech Republic
- Skopje, North Macedonia
- Uzhhorod, Ukraine

== Notable people ==
- Archduke Karl Albrecht of Austria, Austrian and Polish officer and landowner
- Danijel Aleksić, Serbian footballer
- Susy Andersen, Italian actress
- Laura Antonelli, Italian actress
- Giovanni Arpino, Italian writer and journalist
- Vladimir Arsenijević, Serbian author
- Lidia Bastianich, Italian American chef-restaurateur
- Erma Bossi, Italian expressionist painter
- Dženan Čišija, Swedish politician
- Crispus, Roman caesar
- Lilia Dale, Italian actress
- Jadranka Đokić, Croatian actress
- Wilhelm Ehm, German admiral and chief of the Volksmarine
- Sergio Endrigo, Italian singer-composer
- Samanta Fabris, Croatian volleyball player
- Pasqualino Gobbi, Italian Catholic cleric and author
- Stjepan Hauser, Croatian cellist
- James Joyce, Irish writer, lived in Pula from 1904 to 1905 with his wife Nora Barnacle
- Geppino Micheletti, Italian surgeon
- Helena Minić, Croatian actress
- Johann Palisa, Austrian astronomer
- Mate Parlov, Croatian boxer
- Jolanda di Maria Petris, Italian-Finnish operatic soprano and voice pedagog
- Herman Potočnik, Austrian officer, electrical engineer and astronautics theorist
- Rossana Rossanda, Italian journalist
- Orlando Sain, Italian footballer
- Antonio Smareglia, Italian-Croatian classical composer
- Roberto Soffici, Italian pop singer-songwriter
- Pietro Tradonico, Venetian Doge
- Alida Valli, Italian actress
- Raimondo Vianello, Italian actor who lived in Pula in his youth
- Hede von Trapp, painter
- Alka Vuica, Croatian singer
- Antonio Lussich, Uruguayan poet, son of Filip Luksic.

== See also ==
- List of ancient cities in Illyria
- Roman Catholic Diocese of Poreč-Pula
