= Butler Downtown Historic District =

Historic district in Georgia, United States

- Butler Downtown Historic district
- U.S. National Register of Historic Places
- U.S. Historic district
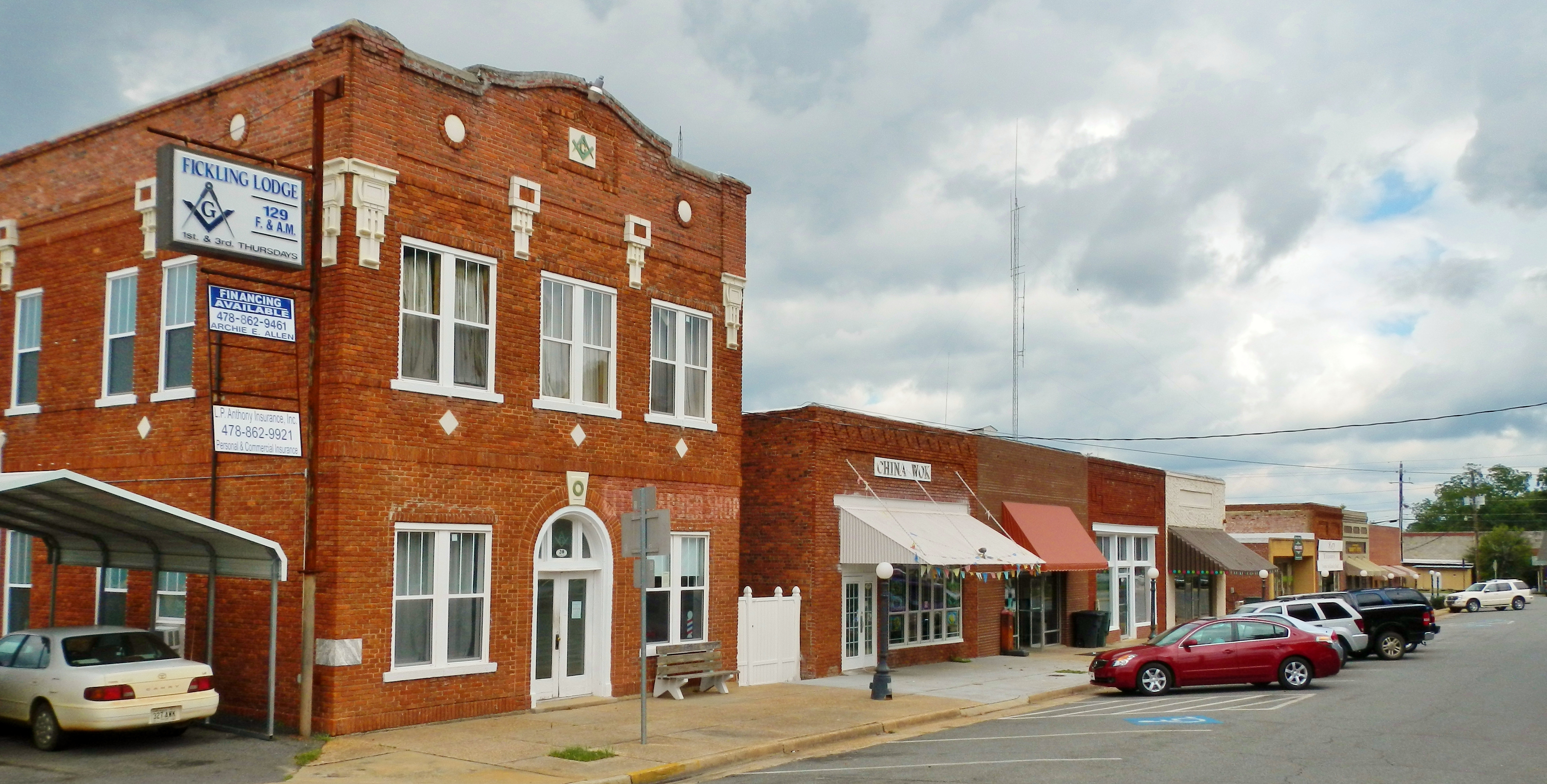

- Location within Georgia
- Location: Downtown Butler centered on the courthouse square and includes resources on Main St., Broad St. and Ivey St., Butler, Georgia
- Area: 23 acres (9.3 ha)
- Built: 1852
- Architect: Frederick Roy Duncan
- Architectural style: Late 19th And 20th Century Revivals, Modern Movement
- MPS: Georgia County Courthouses TR (AD)
- NRHP reference No.: 04001466
- Added to NRHP: January 12, 2005

The Butler Downtown Historic District is a historic district in Butler, Georgia that was listed on the National Register of Historic Places in 2005.

It includes 46 contributing buildings, and also contributing are one site and two other structures (one a Conferate monument).

The Taylor County Courthouse (see accompanying photos #1, #2, #6, #9, and #14) is central in the district. It was designed by Frederick Roy Duncan, was built in 1935, and was separately NRHP-listed in 1995.

The district has three historic gas stations (see photos #10, #11, and #12), which is unusual for a small town or any historic district.

The town's Masonic Lodge (1920; also known as Fickling Lodge; see photo #16), at 20 West Main St., is a two-story brick building with a parapet wall. It has "limestone Art Deco motifs at the corners and along the beltcourse."

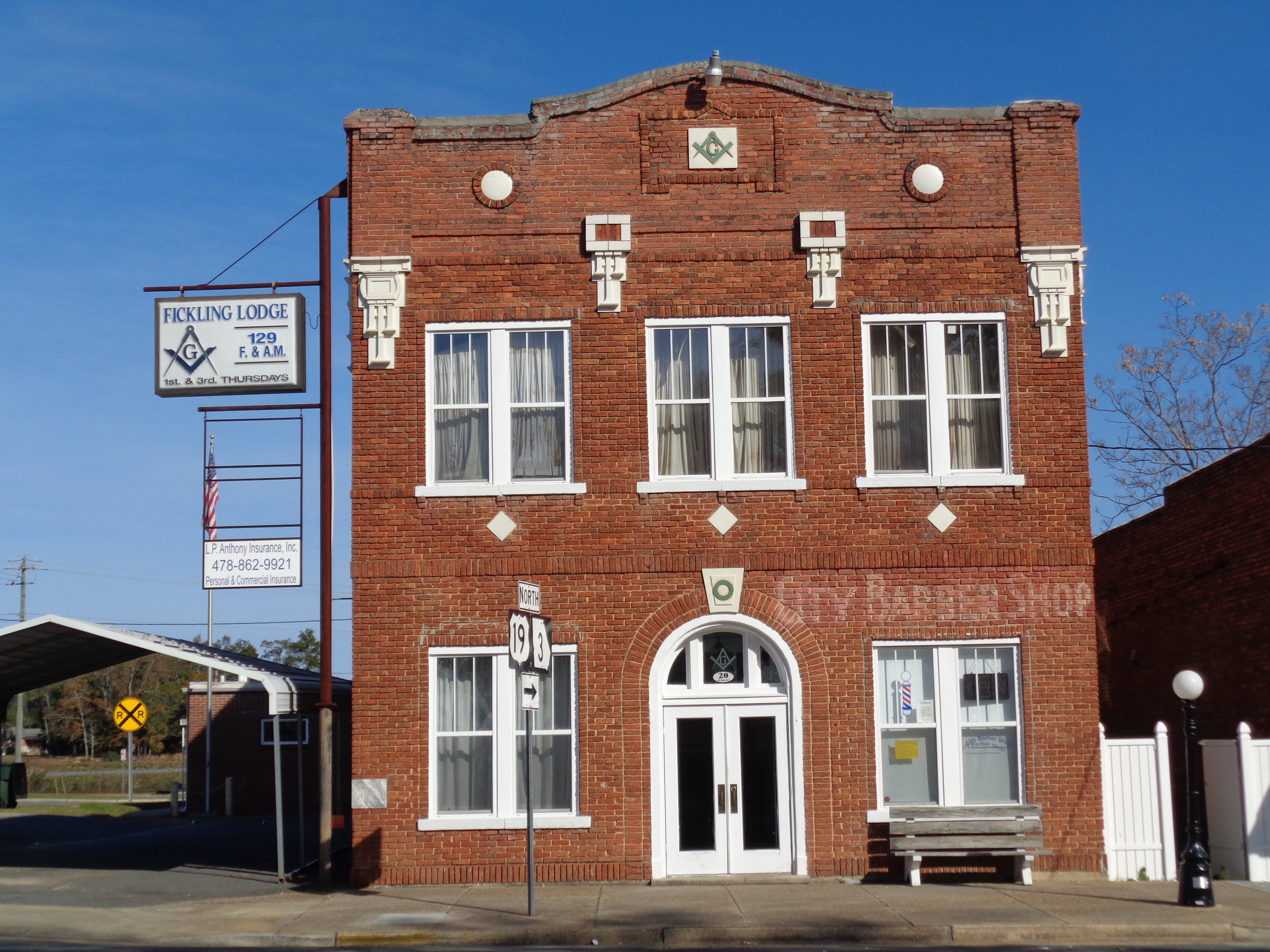
Fickling Lodge

with a parapet; it has limestone Art Deco elements at corners and in the beltcourse. It is the meeting hall for Fickling Lodge #129 F&AM, and a contributing building in Butler Downtown Historic District.

On Ivey Street are two landmarks:

- the Art Moderne-style building at Ivey & Main Streets (c.1940s), originally a car dealership (see photo #6), and
- the Rabbit Box, historic hamburger joint, where John and Ruth Turk made "Turk Burgers" famous (see photo #3).
