= Charlton Greenwood Ogburn =

American lawyer (1882–1962)

Charlton Ogburn
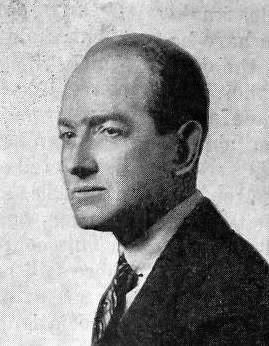
- Ogburn in 1920
- Born: Charlton Greenwood Ogburn; 19 August 1882; Butler, Georgia
- Died: 26 February 1962 (aged 79)
- Occupations: lawyer; writer
- Years active: 1919–1952
- Notable work: The Lawyer and Democracy; This Star of England

Charlton Greenwood Ogburn (19 August 1882 in Butler, Georgia – 26 February 1962) was a lawyer who served as a public official in various capacities from 1917 through to the 1930s. He was employed as legal counsel both for government bureaucracies and labor organizations. His most widely recognized work was undertaken as counsel for the American Federation of Labor in the 1930s.

He later became a noted advocate for the Oxfordian theory of Shakespeare authorship, which asserts that Edward de Vere, 17th Earl of Oxford was the real author of Shakespeare's works. He published two major books on the topic, co-written with his wife Dorothy.

== Family ==
Ogburn was the son of yet another Charlton Greenwood Ogburn and Irene Florence Wynn. His brother William Fielding Ogburn (June 29, 1886 – April 27, 1959) became an influential sociologist responsible for popularizing the idea of "culture lag" to describe the difficulties cultures have in adjusting to new technology or other changes. On 8 June 1910, Ogburn married Dorothy Stevens, born 8 June 1890 in Atlanta, daughter of George Webb Stevens and Abbie Dyson Bean. In the 1930s Dorothy published mystery novels set in Georgia.

== Career ==
Ogburn studied law, graduating from Mercer University in 1905 and then attending Harvard Law School in 1906–1907. He worked in Savannah, Georgia, until 1919, when he moved to New York. A member of the New York Bar from 1921, he worked in corporate law.

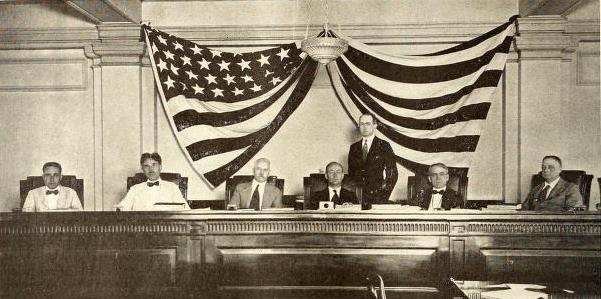
Ogburn (standing) with members of the Federal Electric Railways Commission

After the U.S. entered World War I he became an examiner for the National War Labor Board, serving from 1917 to 1919.

In 1919, he was assigned to take a leading role in a government investigation of the electric railway industry, becoming the legal counsel and executive secretary of the Federal Electric Railways Commission. In 1920, he wrote an article on the work of the commission and its report in the Electric Railway Journal.

He also had a number of administrative posts, and published on legal matters. His most notable writings were essays on the relationship between the law and public policy, Government and Labor and The Lawyer and Democracy (1915). Between 1949 and 1952 he served on the Counsel of the American Bar Association's Interprofessional Commission on Marriage and Divorce Laws.

In the 1930s he worked for the American Federation of Labor and the Reconstruction Finance Corporation. As counsel for the AFL he supported the introduction of laws to defend labor rights, and helped to draft the National Labor Relations Act of 1935. In 1938 Ogburn supported William Green's attempts to maintain the unity of the AFL and resist the breakaway Committee of Industrial Organizations (COI) union. In what has been described as "an incredible display of legal gymnastics" he argued that the AFL's Executive Council did have the power to suspend the COI, contrary to the plain wording of the AFL's constitution. The result was the creation of the independent Congress of Industrial Organizations.

== Oxfordian activity ==
Ogburn was drawn into the Shakespeare authorship question when leading Oxfordian Charles Wisner Barrell approached him for assistance in a lawsuit against Folger Shakespeare Library director Giles Dawson for libel in response to comments made after Barrell published in Scientific American an article claiming that the Ashbourne portrait of "Shakespeare" was an overpainted original of Edward de Vere. The case was eventually settled out of court.

After representing Barrell in the case against Dawson, Ogburn and his wife Dorothy both became very involved in the organizations devoted to Oxfordian theory and the Shakespearean authorship question. They subsequently published two books on the subject together, The Renaissance Man of England (1947) and This Star of England (New York, Howard McCann, 1952), both of which argued in favor of Oxford's authorship. The books also advocate the Prince Tudor theory, the belief that Oxford had a son with Queen Elizabeth I. The Ogburns argued that the child grew up as Henry Wriothesley, 3rd Earl of Southampton.

Charlton and Dorothy's son, also named Charlton Ogburn (sometimes distinguished as "Jr."), after serving as the communications officer for Merrill's Marauders, became a noted State Department analyst and non-fiction writer. He continued his parents' interest in Oxfordianism and wrote several more books on the subject. He co-wrote a book with his mother, Shakespeare: The Man Behind the Name (1962). However, he later distanced himself from his parents' advocacy of Prince Tudor theory.

== Sources ==
- Biographical notes at the Charlton Ogburn papers website
- Obituary for Dorothy Ogburn, Shakespeare Oxford Society newsletter, Vol.17, No.3, page 10.
