= National Register of Historic Places listings in Taylor County, Georgia =

This is a list of properties and districts in Taylor County, Georgia that are listed on the National Register of Historic Places (NRHP).

This National Park Service list is complete through NPS recent listings posted March 21, 2025.

== Current listings ==
	Name on the Register	Image	Date listed	Location	City or town	Description
1	Butler Downtown Historic District	Butler Downtown Historic District	January 12, 2005 (#04001466)	Downtown Butler centered on the courthouse square and includes resources on Main St., Broad St. and Ivey ST. 32°33′24″N 84°14′14″W	Butler	
2	Mauk School	Mauk School	December 30, 2008 (#08001248)	37 GA 127 S. 32°29′59″N 84°25′23″W	Mauk	
3	Ferdinand A. Ricks House	Ferdinand A. Ricks House	June 17, 1982 (#82002482)	S. Collins and E. Calhoun Sts. 32°33′27″N 84°05′35″W	Reynolds	
4	Taylor County Courthouse	Taylor County Courthouse	June 14, 1995 (#95000719)	Main St. 32°33′25″N 84°14′15″W	Butler	
5	Union Methodist Church Cemetery-Hays Campground Cemetery	Union Methodist Church Cemetery-Hays Campground Cemetery	September 6, 2001 (#01000941)	Union Church Rd. 32°38′14″N 84°15′47″W	Butler	
