= Chicago South Shore and South Bend Railroad =

American Class III freight railroad

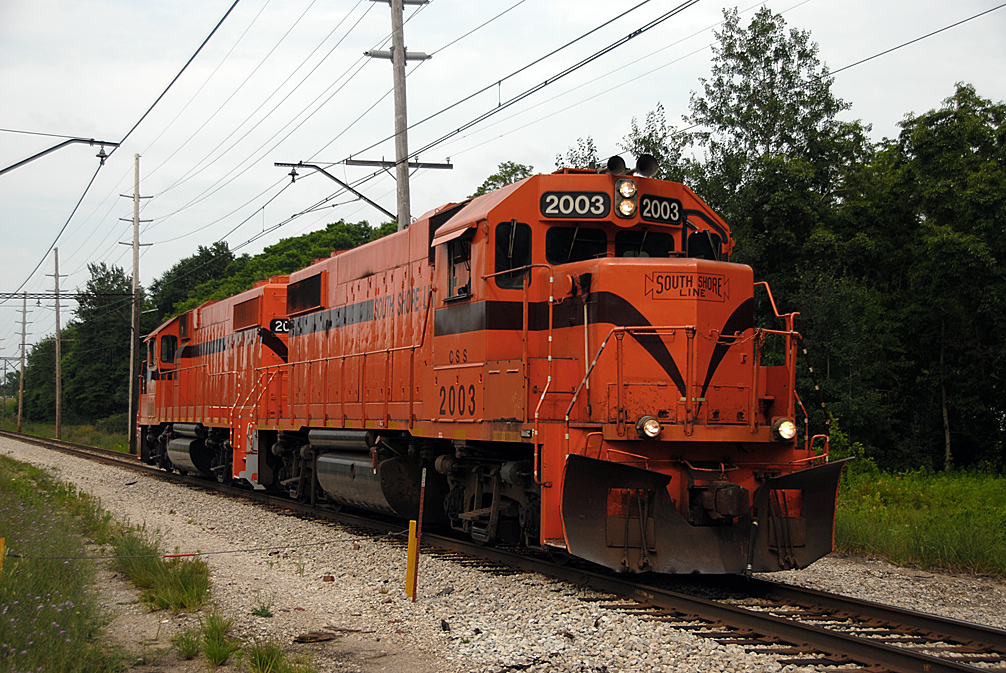
- South Shore Line GP38-2 #2003 at Beverly Shores

Overview
- Headquarters: Michigan City, Indiana
- Reporting mark: CSS
- Locale: Northern Indiana
- Dates of operation: 1925–present
- Predecessor: Chicago Lake Shore and South Bend Railway

Technical
- Track gauge: 4 ft 8 1/2 in (1,435 mm) standard gauge
- Length: 182 miles (293 km)

Other
- Website: www.southshorefreight.com

The Chicago South Shore and South Bend Railroad (reporting mark CSS), also known as the South Shore Line, is a Class III freight railroad operating between Chicago, Illinois, and South Bend, Indiana. The railroad serves as a link between Class I railroads and local industries in northeast Illinois and northwest Indiana. It built the South Shore Line electric interurban and operated it until 1990, when the South Shore transferred its passenger operations to the Northern Indiana Commuter Transportation District. The freight railroad is owned by the Anacostia Rail Holdings Company.

== Operations ==
The Surface Transportation Board classes the South Shore as a Class III railroad. The railroad operates diesel locomotives on the whole line, despite some trackage being electrified for NICTD passenger service. It also operates along the former Indianapolis, La Porte and Michigan City Railroad, later part of the Lake Erie and Western Railroad and New York, Chicago and St. Louis Railroad (Nickel Plate) system, from Michigan City southeast to Dillon (southeast of Stillwell), bought from Norfolk Southern in 2001. Nickel Plate passenger service along that line ended in 1932. The South Shore Line connects to many other railroads in the Chicago area, with connections to the Port of Chicago, Proviso Yard and Joliet.

The railroad's primary businesses are coal and steel. The coal is delivered to the Michigan City generating station owned by Northern Indiana Public Service Company. The railroad also serves steel mills along the line.

== History ==
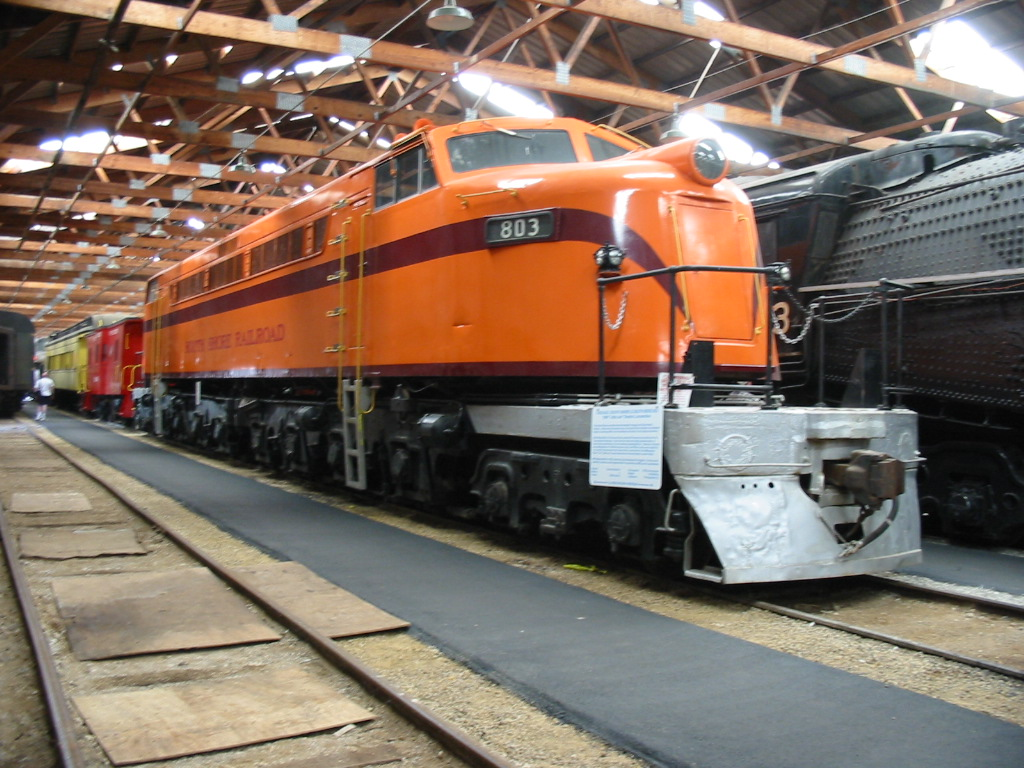
A former Chicago South Shore and South Bend "800" electric freight locomotive

The South Shore Line is the last remaining of the once numerous electric interurban trains in the United States. At its formation on November 30, 1901, the corporate title was the Chicago & Indiana Air Line Railway (Air Line). The Air Line was controlled by Frank and James Seagrave, brothers from Toledo, Ohio, who had envisioned an electrically operated freight and passenger railroad from Toledo to Chicago, Illinois. The Seagrave brothers had completed their Toledo and Western Railroad mainline across the former Great Black Swamp from Toledo to Pioneer, Ohio, in an area that otherwise had no direct rail service to Toledo. A branch was constructed from Sylvania, Ohio, to Adrian, Michigan. The Seagraves’ anticipated that they would build west to Goshen, Indiana, where they would obtain trackage rights from the Indiana Electric Railroad Company (later the Chicago, South Bend and Northern Indiana; successor company to the first commercial electric trolley line in North America) to South Bend where it would connect with the Air Line for Chicago.

Financing to complete the railroad was announced on January 17, 1903. Property acquisition and engineering from South Bend west to the St. Joseph — LaPorte county line was completed within the year. The Seagraves’ also obtained franchises for operation in the streets of South Bend, New Carlisle, and Michigan City. The Seagraves’ began streetcar operations on a route between East Chicago and Indiana Harbor in September 1903. Grading for the railroad was begun in St. Joseph County during 1903, but the Rich Man's Panic put an end to the work and apparently the Seagraves’ interest in the company.

The historical significance of the Seagraves’ effort in developing what would become the South Shore Line was that in 1903 there was no business model for a short line regional high-speed electrified railroad handling freight and passengers. Economic historians George Hilton and John Due noted in their history of the interurbans that the Seagraves’ effort was probably the first. But for the Panic of 1903, the Seagraves’ would have likely completed what is recognized today as a regional high-speed electrified railroad from Toledo to Chicago.

The directors of the Air Line voted for a corporate name change on July 30, 1904: The Chicago, Lake Shore and South Bend Railway Company. In 1907, with the easing of monetary pressures, property acquisition, engineering, and construction began again under the direction of a new promoter, James B. Hanna. Although the scope of the project was then limited to a rail line from Chicago to South Bend, the business model posited by the Seagraves’ remained.

The first phase of construction from South Bend to Michigan City was completed and in scheduled service on July 1, 1908. The remainder of the line from Michigan City to Hammond was in service on September 6, only twenty-one days before the first Ford Model T automobile left the Piquette Avenue Plant in Detroit. In December, the company officially rebranded its operation as the South Shore Line.

Not only was the South Shore Lines embroiled in a transportation war with the automobile, but it was also unwittingly embroiled in the war of the currents waged by Thomas Edison and George Westinghouse. Edison famously clung to his original direct current system, while Westinghouse embraced the alternating current system developed by Nikola Tesla. While alternating current proved to be superior to direct current for municipal power grids, the technology to precisely control the speed of an AC motor was still being developed, while control technology for DC motors was well-established. Some twenty other interurbans adopted the Westinghouse system, most between 1904 and 1908. The alternating current system was not perfected however, and nearly all the lines operating with it were quickly converted to direct current, some in as little as three years. Despite the high expense of maintaining the alternating current system, the South Shore Lines would not find itself in a financial position to convert to direct current until taken over in the 1920s. (The line utilized streetcar voltages in Gary, Michigan City, and South Bend.)

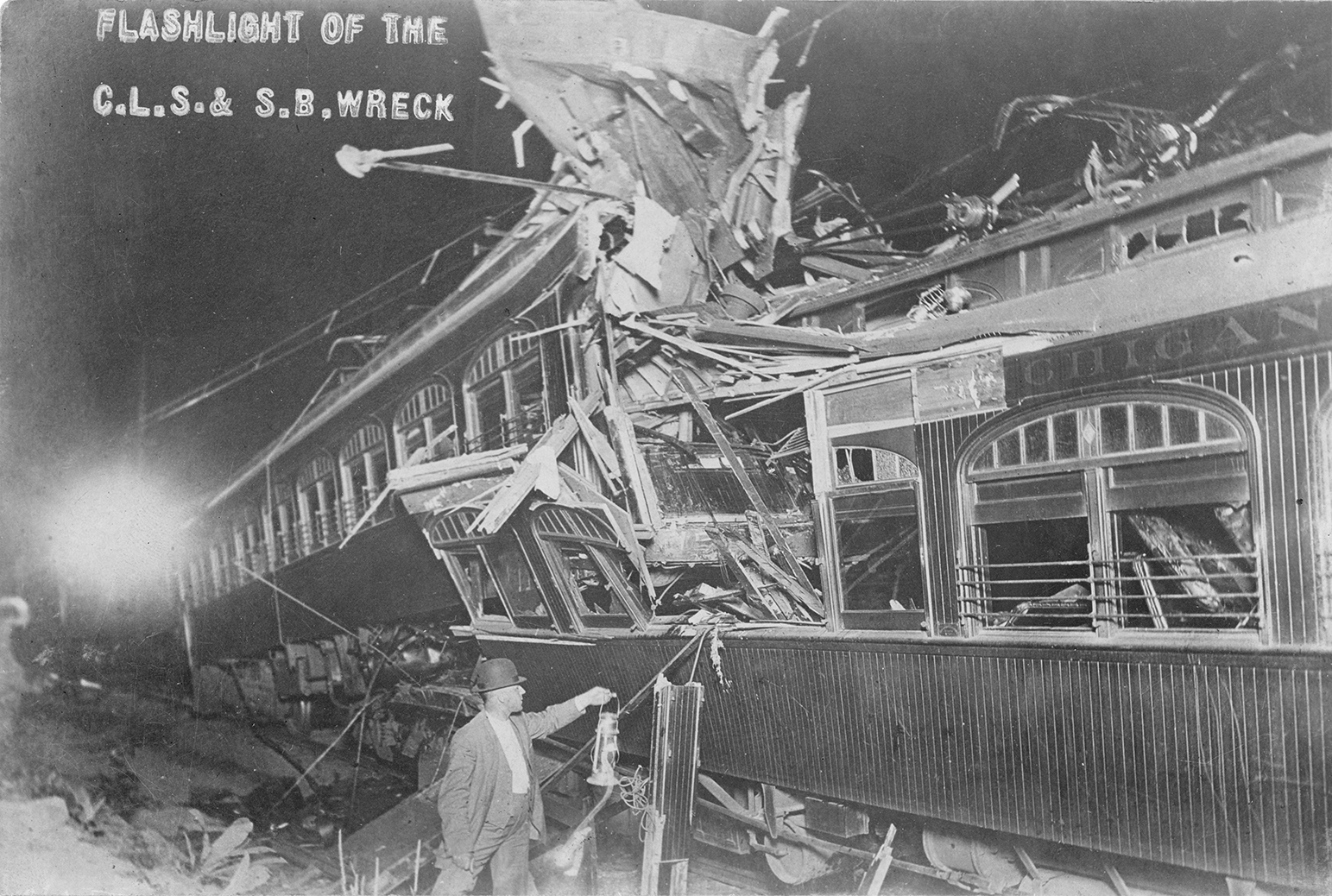
Wreck at Shadyside, Indiana, 19 June 1909. The motorman of eastbound car #73 (foreground) overran a meeting point and collided with westbound car #3. As a result, twelve were killed and 25 injured.

The South Shore Lines found itself in financial difficulty from the start as passenger revenues were insufficient to cover the railway's bonded indebtedness. This was exacerbated by claims resulting from two head-on wrecks in 1909 that resulted in an unfunded legislative mandate to install a costly block signal system. Despite these setbacks, service had been extended to Pullman on Chicago's South Side on April 4, 1909. An agreement with the Illinois Central Railroad dated May 25, 1912, called for non-motorized trail coaches to be attached to trains originating in Gary to be hauled by steam locomotives for the run to Randolph Street near Chicago's Loop via the Kensington and Eastern Railroad.

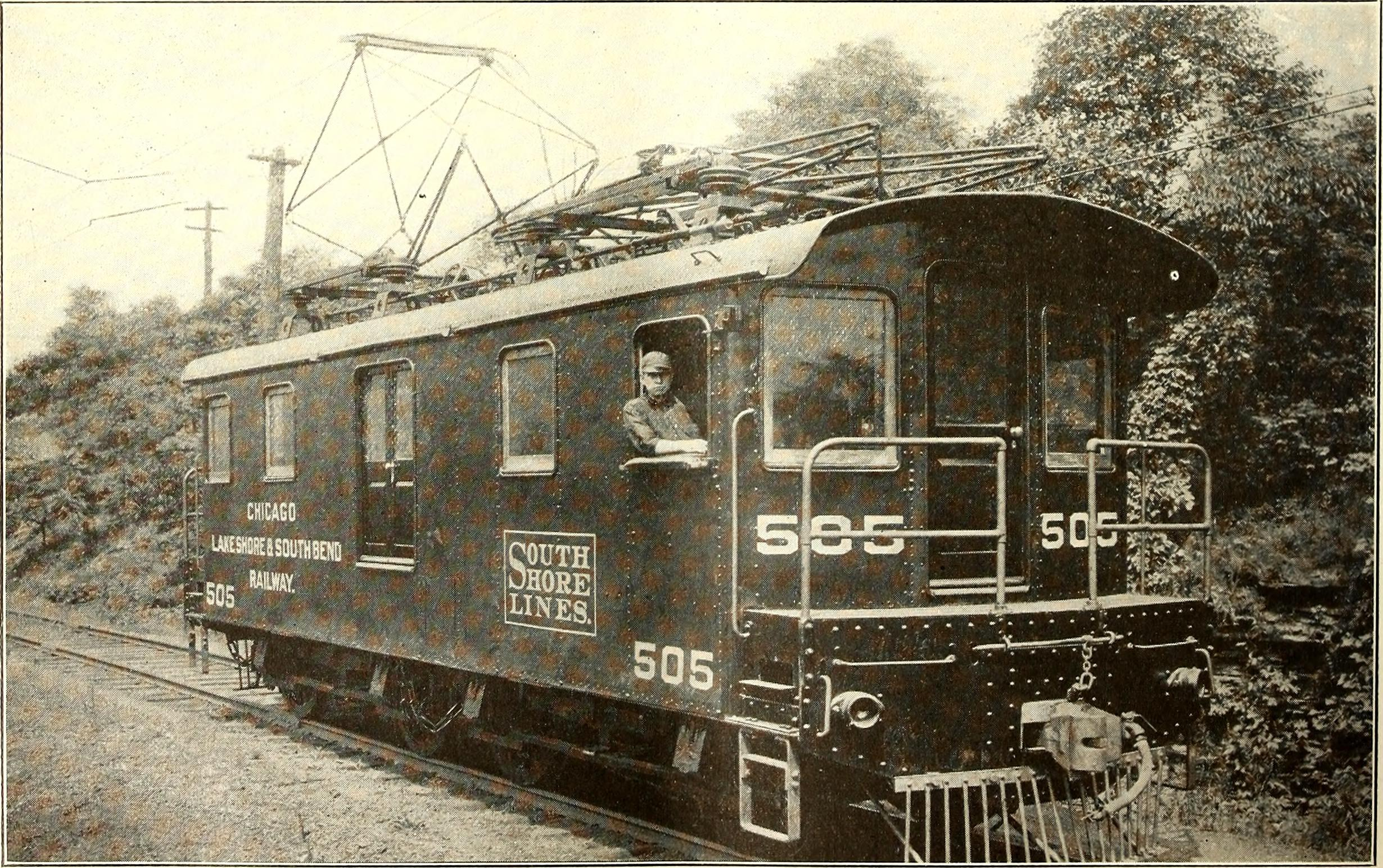
South Shore #505, a Westinghouse box cab purchased for freight service, featured in a 1916 issue of Electric Railway Journal

Attempting to overcome inadequate earnings, the South Shore Lines made every effort to develop freight service in 1916, and an excursion business to bring Chicagoans to the Indiana Dunes, the amusement park at Michigan City, and the Casino at Hudson Lake. The most significant of the rail excursions to the development of Northwest Indiana were the regular outings of the Prairie Club of Chicago on the South Shore Lines that began in 1909. The access to the Dunes that the South Shore Lines provided to the Prairie Club led the members to erect cabins in the Dunes. With assistance from Stephen Mather, the first director of the National Park Service, The Prairie Club soon waged a lobbying campaign for the creation of a Sand Dunes National Park that for a time was unsuccessful, but did culminate in the opening of the Indiana Dunes State Park in 1925. Congressional authorization of a National Park Service unit in the Dunes in 1966 resulted in the Indiana Dunes National Lakeshore (now Indiana Dunes National Park).

In 1925, the Cleveland Trust Company still held the original construction bonds of the South Shore Lines in the amount of $9,500,000 ($174 million in 2025 adjusted for inflation). The prior year, Samuel Insull, a utilities developer who had electric and gas utility investments throughout much of the United States, sought a means of developing a new customer base with a balanced electrical load in the Indiana Dunes country. After investigating both the South Shore Lines and the Chicago, South Bend and Northern Indiana, Insull had the South Shore Lines appraised. Based upon the depreciated appraised value of $6,463,076, and with a commitment to invest $2,500,000 in the property, Insull purchased the original construction debt from Cleveland Trust in exchange for 6% noncumulative debentures. Insull controlled a 60% majority stock interest in the new company. The closing of the transaction took place on June 29, 1925, six days after Insull reorganized it as the Chicago South Shore and South Bend Railroad, which it remains today. Plans were promptly put in place to remove their 6,600 Volt AC system and replace it with a more conventional 1,500 Volt DC system.

The railroad experienced further bankruptcies in 1933 and 1938. The post-World War II decline in traffic hurt the company, and it was bought by the Chesapeake and Ohio Railway (C&O) in 1967. In 1977, the Northern Indiana Commuter Transportation District (NICTD) began subsidizing the passenger operations on the South Shore Line. In 1984, the Venango River Corporation purchased the South Shore from the C&O. Venango declared bankruptcy in 1989. In 1990, the Anacostia and Pacific Company acquired the South Shore. The NICTD purchased the passenger assets. The South Shore acquired the Kensington and Eastern Railroad from the Illinois Central Railroad in 1996.

== Rolling stock ==
=== Active ===
Manufacturer	Model	Entered service	Fleet Series	Quantity	Notes	Image
EMD	GP38-2		2000–2009	10		
EMD	SD38-2		804–805	2	Purchased from IAIS	
EMD	GP38-3		2010	1	On long-term lease from sister L&IRR	

=== Retired ===
Manufacturer	Model	Entered service	Fleet Series	Quantity	Year of retirement	Notes	Image
Westinghouse		1916	501–	[data missing]	[data missing]		
Baldwin-General Electric	Steeple Cab	c. 1920s–1930s	1001–	[data missing]	[data missing]		
General Electric	Little Joe	1949	801–803	3	1981	Main article: Little Joe (electric locomotive) § South Shore Line	
ALCO	R-Motor	c. 1955	701–707	7	c. 1970s	10 units acquired from the New York Central Railroad in 1955.	

=== Preserved equipment ===
One wooden passenger car has survived from the South Shore Lines. Combination coach-baggage car #73 was built by the Niles Car and Manufacturing Company in 1908. It was wrecked in a crash on June 19, 1909, though was rebuilt for service. #73 is currently undergoing restoration.

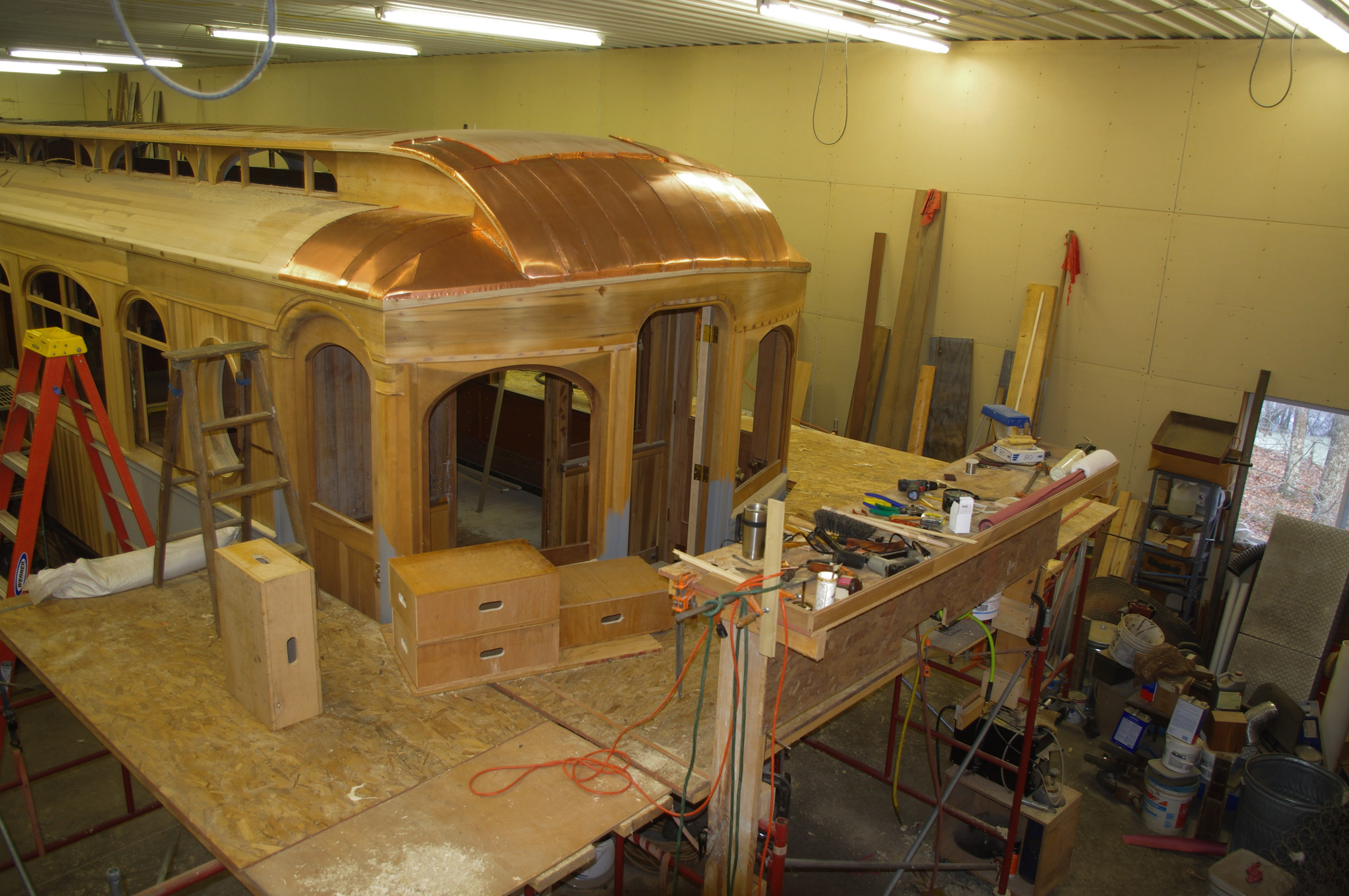
Exterior

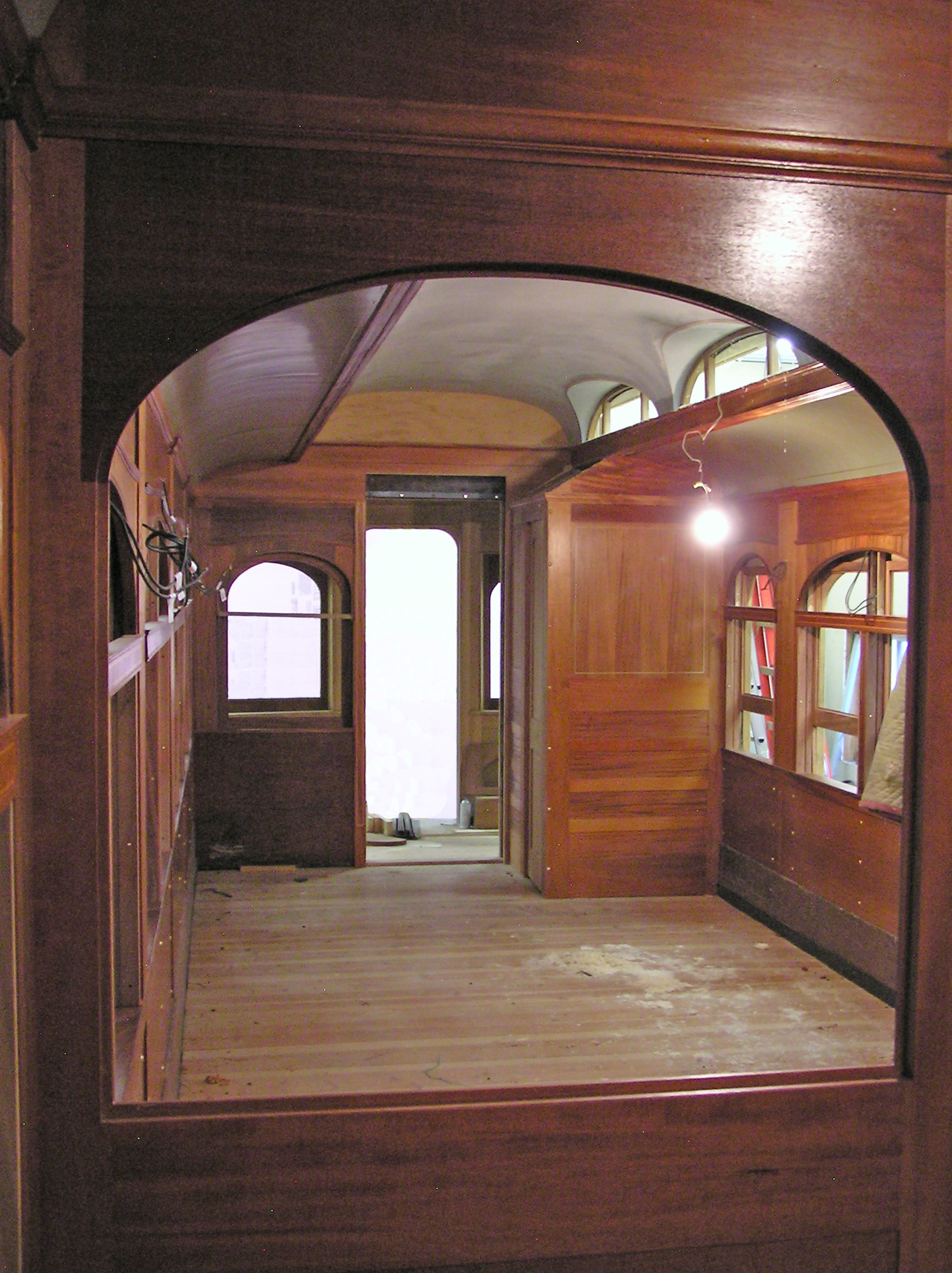
Interior

South Shore Lines #73 undergoing restoration.
