= Murder of Maceo Snipes =

1946 murder in Georgia, U.S.

- Date: July 18, 1946
- Location: Taylor County, Georgia
- Type: Murder
- Deaths: 1

Maceo Snipes was a veteran and civil rights leader who was murdered in Taylor County, Georgia on July 18, 1946, after Snipes, a black World War II veteran, voted in the Georgia Democratic Party primary. He was the only Black person to vote in the entire county.

== Background ==
Snipes was the only African American to vote in a Democratic primary in Taylor County, Georgia. During this time, the white supremacist terrorist group KKK was in its prime. KKK members were responsible for multiple lynchings of black people who decided to vote following Snipes' murder. For example, two black couples were lynched five days later. Prior to the election, the KKK had made threats to lynch any black person who dared cast a vote. Snipes and his mother were both sharecroppers on Homer Chapman's land in Butler, Georgia.

== The murder ==
The day after Snipes cast his vote, four white men pulled up to the land Chapman rented to Snipes' family. All four were suspected KKK members: two were later identified as Edward Williamson and Lynwood Harvey, both WWII veterans.

Having pulled up outside Snipes' grandfather's house, the four white men asked Snipes' mother to call him outside. They then confronted him, and it ended with Williamson shooting Snipes in the back. After the men left, Snipes and his mother walked to Chapman's house. Chapman helped them walk 3 miles (5 km) to the hospital in Butler. The hospital staff did not treat Snipes until six hours later. By then, he needed a blood transfusion. The staff claimed that they did not have any "black blood". Two days later, Snipes died in the hospital from his injuries.

== Investigation and charges ==
Williamson was an initial suspect in the investigation. In front of a coroner's jury, he claimed that Maceo owed him a $10 debt. Supposedly, Williamson and Harvey went to Snipes to confront him on his debt. Williamson said that Snipes had pulled out a knife, so he shot Snipes twice in the back, claiming self-defense. Coroner J.D. Cooke and a jury declared Williamson's actions as justified. Williamson was exonerated on his charges on July 29, 1946.

== Legacy ==
Edward Williamson committed suicide on October 29, 1985, allegedly out of remorse for what he had done. Lynwood Harvey died on March 20, 2003.

"We [Negros] want and are entitled to the basic rights and opportunities of American citizens: the right to work . . .; equal opportunities in education, health, recreation and similar public services; the right to vote; equality before the law; [and] . . . the same courtesy and good manners . . ."

— 17-year-old Martin Luther King Jr. (1946) in letter to editor, prompted in part by the lynching of Maceo Snipes

The Butler funeral director and Snipes' uncle buried Snipes at an unmarked grave in the Butler cemetery. It is not known exactly where Snipes' body is buried. He did not receive a proper empty casket burial until 2007. Snipes' story, along with the murder of the two black couples, received coverage in the newspapers, such as the Atlanta Constitution. A 17-year-old student at Morehouse College, Martin Luther King Jr., wrote a letter in response to the newspaper's remarks on the killings of Snipes and the Moore's Ford lynchings of two black married couples, George and Mae Murray Dorsey, and Roger and Dorothy Malcom.

In February 2007, the Georgia NAACP and the Prison and Jail Project sent a letter to U.S. Attorney General Alberto Gonzales requesting a federal probe of the murder of Maceo Snipes. In announcing the reopening of decades-old suspicious murders in the civil rights era a few weeks after the request, the U.S. Justice Department declined to comment whether the probe would include the Maceo Snipes case.
