= Taylor County, Georgia =

County in Georgia, United States

- County
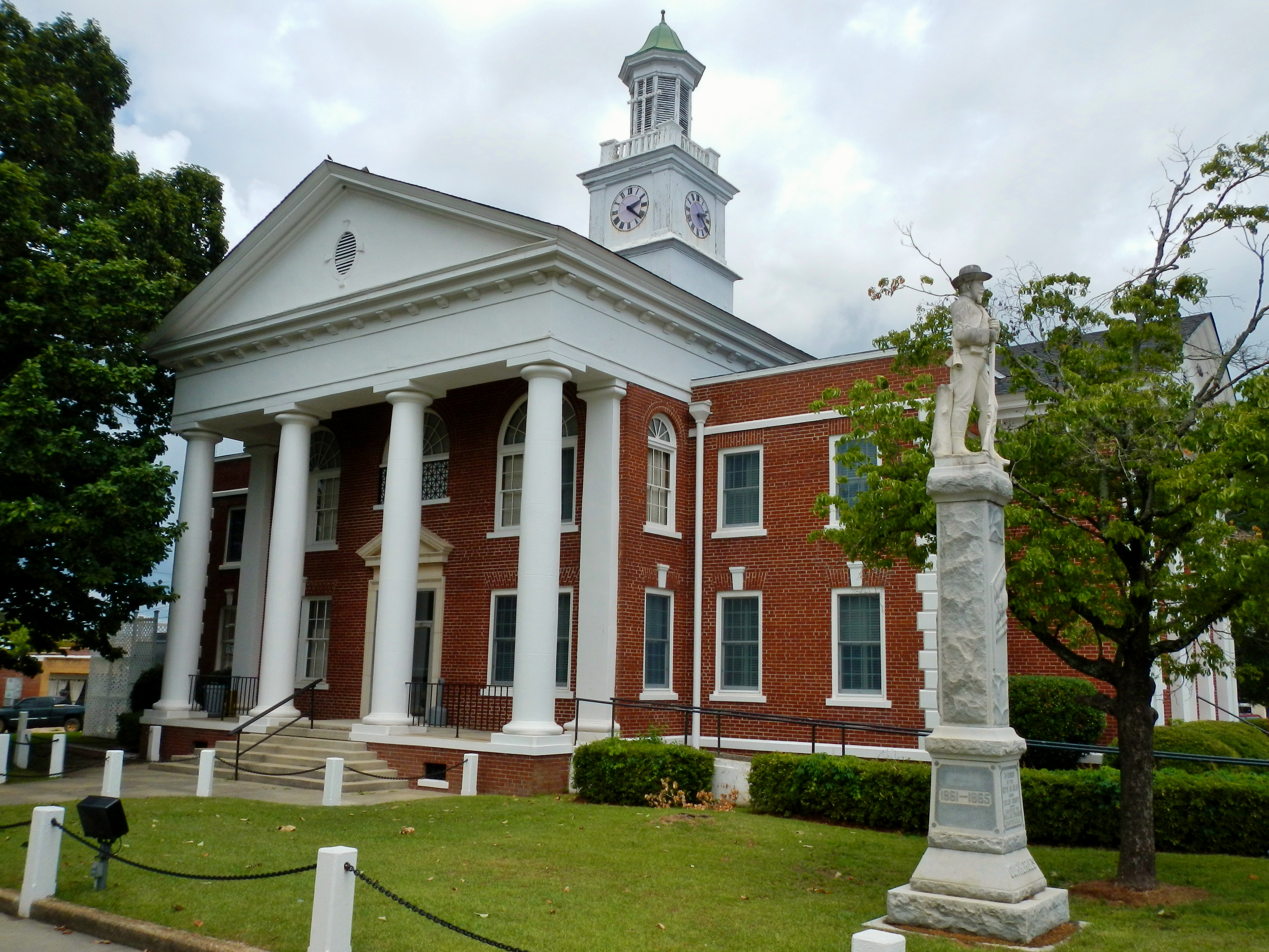
- Taylor County Courthouse in Butler

- Location within the U.S. state of Georgia
- Coordinates: 32°33′N 84°15′W
- Country: United States
- State: Georgia
- Founded: January 15, 1852; 174 years ago
- Named for: Zachary Taylor
- Seat: Butler
- Largest city: Butler

Area
  - Total: 380 sq mi (980 km^{2})
  - Land: 377 sq mi (980 km^{2})
  - Water: 3.0 sq mi (7.8 km^{2}) 0.8%

Population (2020)
  - Total: 7,816
  - Estimate (2025): 7,818 ▲
  - Density: 20.7/sq mi (8.00/km^{2})
- Time zone: UTC−5 (Eastern)
  - Summer (DST): UTC−4 (EDT)
- Congressional district: 2nd
- Website: taylorcountyga.com

Taylor County is a county located in the west central portion of the U.S. state of Georgia. As of the 2020 census, the population was 7,816. The county seat and largest city is Butler.

== History ==
Taylor County was created on January 15, 1852, by an act of the Georgia General Assembly from portions of Macon, Marion and Talbot counties. The county is named for Zachary Taylor, twelfth President of the United States.

Taylor County is also widely known for its history of racism and Jim Crow era subjugation of its African-American populace, which continued long into the 20th century. An especially egregious case is the 1946 lynching of Maceo Snipes, a World War II veteran and the first African-American to vote in Taylor County, for which he was murdered by the KKK on his doorstep in the hours following. Although not immediately succumbing to his wounds, Mr. Snipes death was eventually caused by the lack of availability of "black blood", or transfusions from a black person, at a Butler, Georgia hospital to which he was forced to walk three miles with gunshot wounds to his back. The murderers were never tried or otherwise held to account for their crimes, despite the involvement of the FBI. Mr. Snipes' murder was a motivating factor in Martin Luther King, Jr.'s first and only letter to the Atlanta Constitution at age 17, decrying the terrorism experienced by black citizens in the state at that time, which occurred largely at the hands of or with the blessing of the local and state authorities.

== Geography ==
According to the U.S. Census Bureau, the county has a total area of 380 square miles (980 km^{2}), of which 377 square miles (980 km^{2}) is land and 3.0 square miles (7.8 km^{2}) (0.8%) is water.

Taylor County is dissected by the Fall Line geological formation. The upper half of the county is located in the Piedmont region and consists of gently rolling hills and clay-based soils. The lower half of the county is located in the Upper Atlantic Coastal Plain and is markedly flatter and the soil more sandy. The Flint River marks the entirety of the county's northeastern border.

The county is driven by a largely agricultural economy. Peaches, strawberries, pecans, peanuts, watermelons, and cotton are the most commonly raised crops. Lumbering is also important to the local economy. The county is heavily forested in most areas due in part to the many large plantation pine farms. There are also many desirable hardwood forests, especially along the Flint River basin and tributary streams. The southwestern portion of the county is covered with large sandhills that have given rise to several stable sand mining operations.

The county supports a very healthy population of animals, including white-tailed deer, wild turkey, eastern cottontail, raccoon, coyote, bobcat, nine-banded armadillo, Virginia opossum, red-tailed hawk, and the federally endangered Florida gopher tortoise. Taylor County is home to five of North America's venomous snakes (eastern diamondback rattlesnake, timber rattlesnake, Carolina pygmy rattlesnake, eastern coral snake, water moccasin, and copperhead), representing every North American family of venomous snake.

The dominant tree species are southern red oak, post oak, longleaf pine, loblolly pine, sweetgum, and red maple. Taylor County contains the largest stands of Atlantic white cedar in the state of Georgia. These stands can be found along much of Whitewater and Little Whitewater creeks and are at the heart of a growing movement to conserve these plant communities for posterity.

The vast majority of Taylor County is located in the Upper Flint River sub-basin of the ACF River Basin (Apalachicola-Chattahoochee-Flint River Basin), with the exception of a tiny corner of the county just north of Georgia, which is located in the Middle Chattahoochee River-Walter F. George Lake sub-basin of the same ACF River Basin.

=== Major highways ===
- U.S. Route 19 / State Route 3
- U.S. Route 80 / State Route 22
- State Route 90
- State Route 96 / State Route 540 (Fall Line Freeway)
- State Route 127
- State Route 128
- State Route 137
- State Route 208

=== Adjacent counties ===
- Upson County (north)
- Crawford County (northeast)
- Peach County (east)
- Macon County (southeast)
- Schley County (south)
- Marion County (southwest)
- Talbot County (northwest)

== Communities ==
=== City ===
- Butler

=== Town ===
- Reynolds

=== Census-designated place ===
- Howard

=== Unincorporated communities ===
- Mauk
- Rupert
- Charing

== Demographics ==
Historical population
Census	Pop.	Note	%±
1860	5,998		—
1870	7,143		19.1%
1880	8,597		20.4%
1890	8,666		0.8%
1900	9,846		13.6%
1910	10,839		10.1%
1920	11,473		5.8%
1930	10,617		−7.5%
1940	10,768		1.4%
1950	9,113		−15.4%
1960	8,311		−8.8%
1970	7,865		−5.4%
1980	7,902		0.5%
1990	7,642		−3.3%
2000	8,815		15.3%
2010	8,906		1.0%
2020	7,816		−12.2%
2025 (est.)	7,818	▲	0.0%
U.S. Decennial Census; 1790-1880 1890-1910; 1920-1930 1930-1940; 1940-1950 1960-1980; 1980-2000 2010

=== Racial and ethnic composition ===
Taylor County, Georgia – Racial and ethnic composition Note: the US Census treats Hispanic/Latino as an ethnic category. This table excludes Latinos from the racial categories and assigns them to a separate category. Hispanics/Latinos may be of any race.
Race / Ethnicity (NH = Non-Hispanic)	Pop 1980	Pop 1990	Pop 2000	Pop 2010	Pop 2020	% 1980	% 1990	% 2000	% 2010	% 2020
White alone (NH)	4,681	4,289	4,847	5,123	4,584	59.24%	56.12%	54.99%	57.52%	58.65%
Black or African American alone (NH)	3,098	3,289	3,736	3,485	2,807	39.21%	43.04%	42.38%	39.13%	35.91%
Native American or Alaska Native alone (NH)	2	2	9	5	27	0.03%	0.03%	0.10%	0.06%	0.35%
Asian alone (NH)	4	4	16	57	29	0.05%	0.05%	0.18%	0.64%	0.37%
Native Hawaiian or Pacific Islander alone (NH)	x	x	0	0	2	x	x	0.00%	0.00%	0.03%
Other race alone (NH)	6	0	1	4	19	0.08%	0.00%	0.01%	0.04%	0.24%
Mixed race or Multiracial (NH)	x	x	43	68	180	x	x	0.49%	0.76%	2.30%
Hispanic or Latino (any race)	111	58	163	164	168	1.40%	0.76%	1.85%	1.84%	2.15%
Total	7,902	7,642	8,815	8,906	7,816	100.00%	100.00%	100.00%	100.00%	100.00%

=== 2020 census ===
As of the 2020 census, there were 7,816 people and 2,208 families residing in the county.

The median age was 45.3 years. 21.7% of residents were under the age of 18 and 20.7% of residents were 65 years of age or older. For every 100 females there were 91.4 males, and for every 100 females age 18 and over there were 85.6 males age 18 and over. 0.0% of residents lived in urban areas, while 100.0% lived in rural areas.

There were 3,249 households in the county, of which 29.0% had children under the age of 18 living with them and 34.4% had a female householder with no spouse or partner present. About 32.2% of all households were made up of individuals and 15.2% had someone living alone who was 65 years of age or older.

There were 3,894 housing units, of which 16.6% were vacant. Among occupied housing units, 68.8% were owner-occupied and 31.2% were renter-occupied. The homeowner vacancy rate was 0.6% and the rental vacancy rate was 8.0%.

The racial makeup of the county was 59.4% White, 36.2% Black or African American, 0.3% American Indian and Alaska Native, 0.5% Asian, 0.1% Native Hawaiian and Pacific Islander, 0.8% from some other race, and 2.8% from two or more races. Hispanic or Latino residents of any race comprised 2.1% of the population.

== Politics ==
As of the 2020s, Taylor County is a Republican stronghold, voting 65.29% for Donald Trump in 2024. For elections to the United States House of Representatives, Taylor County is part of Georgia's 2nd congressional district, currently represented by Sanford Bishop. For elections to the Georgia State Senate, Taylor County is part of District 15. For elections to the Georgia House of Representatives, Taylor County is part of District 150.

United States presidential election results for Taylor County, Georgia
Year	Republican		Democratic		Third party(ies)	
Year	No.	%	No.	%	No.	%
1912	98	21.44%	342	74.84%	17	3.72%
1916	113	19.65%	405	70.43%	57	9.91%
1920	211	30.06%	491	69.94%	0	0.00%
1924	96	19.75%	370	76.13%	20	4.12%
1928	353	37.43%	590	62.57%	0	0.00%
1932	44	6.01%	685	93.58%	3	0.41%
1936	147	15.96%	771	83.71%	3	0.33%
1940	213	21.07%	796	78.73%	2	0.20%
1944	269	25.82%	773	74.18%	0	0.00%
1948	99	8.99%	638	57.95%	364	33.06%
1952	277	14.16%	1,679	85.84%	0	0.00%
1956	276	16.88%	1,359	83.12%	0	0.00%
1960	365	23.31%	1,201	76.69%	0	0.00%
1964	1,372	55.55%	1,097	44.41%	1	0.04%
1968	393	14.50%	691	25.50%	1,626	60.00%
1972	1,580	75.45%	514	24.55%	0	0.00%
1976	504	20.44%	1,962	79.56%	0	0.00%
1980	815	30.21%	1,845	68.38%	38	1.41%
1984	1,292	49.09%	1,340	50.91%	0	0.00%
1988	1,145	50.13%	1,134	49.65%	5	0.22%
1992	1,078	37.53%	1,508	52.51%	286	9.96%
1996	1,002	37.77%	1,450	54.66%	201	7.58%
2000	1,412	50.79%	1,340	48.20%	28	1.01%
2004	1,912	56.52%	1,458	43.10%	13	0.38%
2008	2,021	56.34%	1,536	42.82%	30	0.84%
2012	1,948	55.03%	1,572	44.41%	20	0.56%
2016	2,064	60.56%	1,296	38.03%	48	1.41%
2020	2,420	62.99%	1,388	36.13%	34	0.88%
2024	2,600	65.29%	1,366	34.30%	16	0.40%

United States Senate election results for Taylor County, Georgia2
Year	Republican		Democratic		Third party(ies)	
Year	No.	%	No.	%	No.	%
2020	2,399	63.26%	1,312	34.60%	81	2.14%
2020	2,118	61.07%	1,350	38.93%	0	0.00%

United States Senate election results for Taylor County, Georgia3
Year	Republican		Democratic		Third party(ies)	
Year	No.	%	No.	%	No.	%
2020	1,173	31.12%	962	25.52%	1,634	43.35%
2020	2,418	63.55%	1,387	36.45%	0	0.00%
2022	2,020	63.13%	1,145	35.78%	35	1.09%
2022	1,879	62.55%	1,125	37.45%	0	0.00%

Georgia Gubernatorial election results for Taylor County
Year	Republican		Democratic		Third party(ies)	
Year	No.	%	No.	%	No.	%
2022	2,137	66.45%	1,069	33.24%	10	0.31%

== Education ==
The Taylor County School District has four schools, including the Taylor County High School.

== See also ==
- National Register of Historic Places listings in Taylor County, Georgia
- List of counties in Georgia
