= Taylor County High School =

Taylor County High School may refer to:

- Taylor County High School (Georgia)
- Taylor County High School (Kentucky)
- Taylor County High School in Perry, Florida
