= Frederick Duncan (disambiguation) =

Fred Duncan was an Australian politician.

Frederick or Fred Duncan may also refer to:

- Frederick Roy Duncan, engineer and architect
- Fred Duncan (comics)
- Frederick Duncan, of the Duncan baronets
