= Mauk, Georgia =

- Unincorporated community
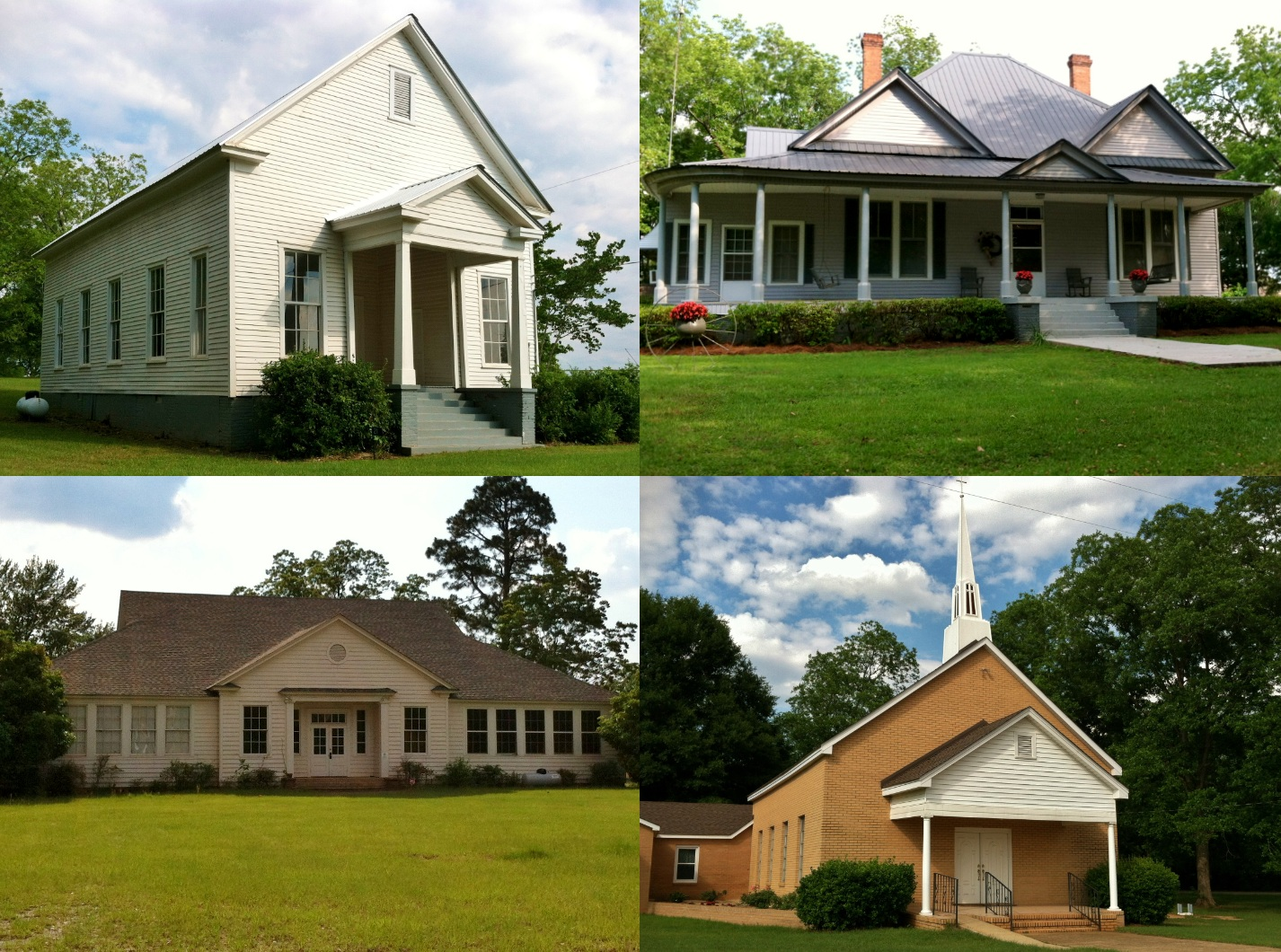

- Location within Georgia Location within the United States
- Coordinates: 32°30′5.9″N 84°25′16″W
- Country: United States
- State: Georgia
- County: Taylor
- Elevation: 781 ft (238 m)
- Time zone: UTC-5 (Eastern (EST))
  - Summer (DST): UTC-4 (EDT)
- ZIP code: 31058
- Area code: 478
- GNIS feature ID: 0317801

Mauk is an unincorporated community in Taylor County, Georgia, United States. It lies approximately 12 km south of Junction City.

== History ==
The Georgia General Assembly incorporated Mauk as a town in 1913. The town's municipal charter was repealed in 1939.

== Gallery ==
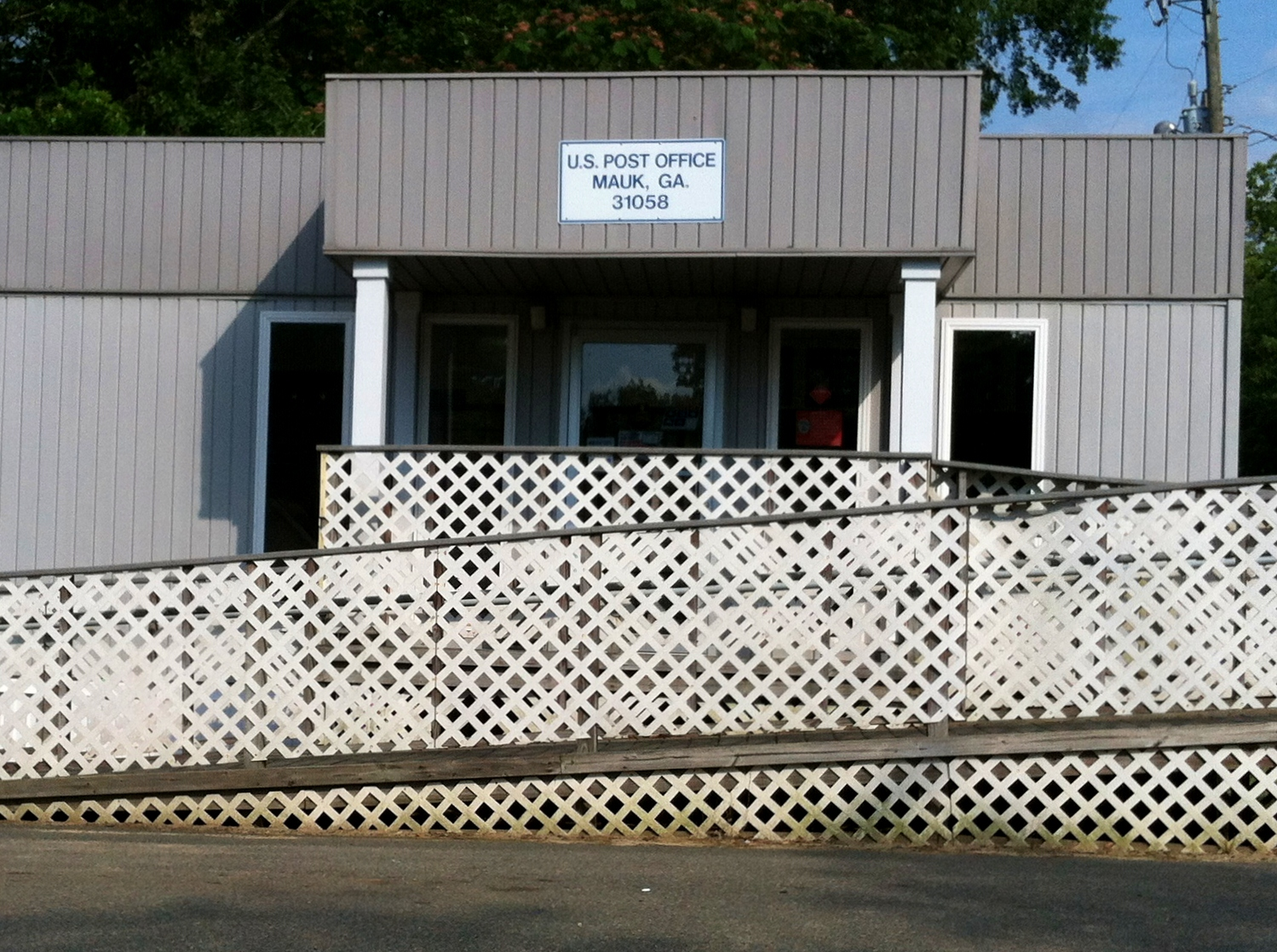
Mauk Post Office (ZIP code: 31058)

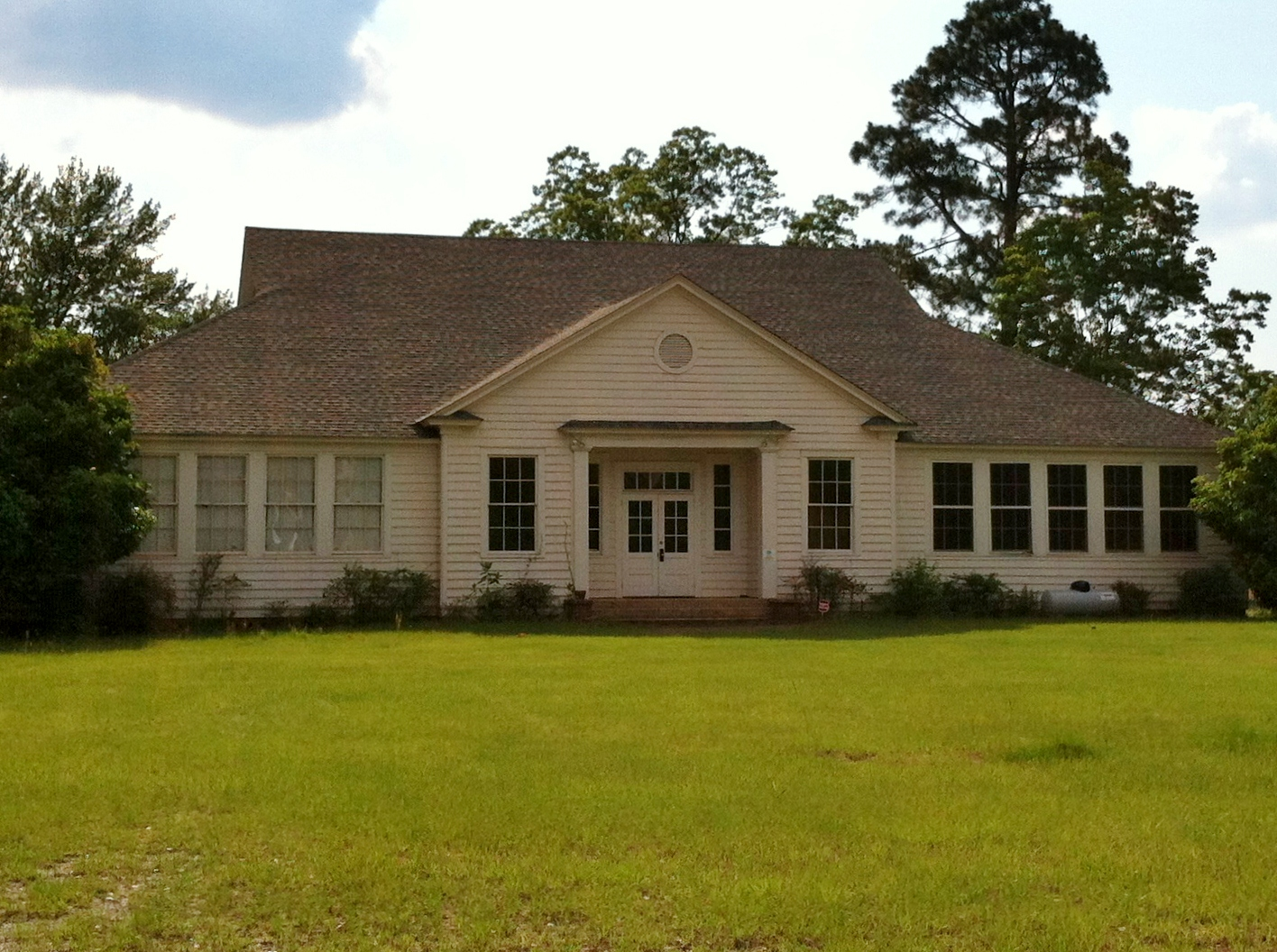
Old Mauk schoolhouse, placed on the National Register of Historic Places on December 30, 2008.
