= Milo R. Maltbie =

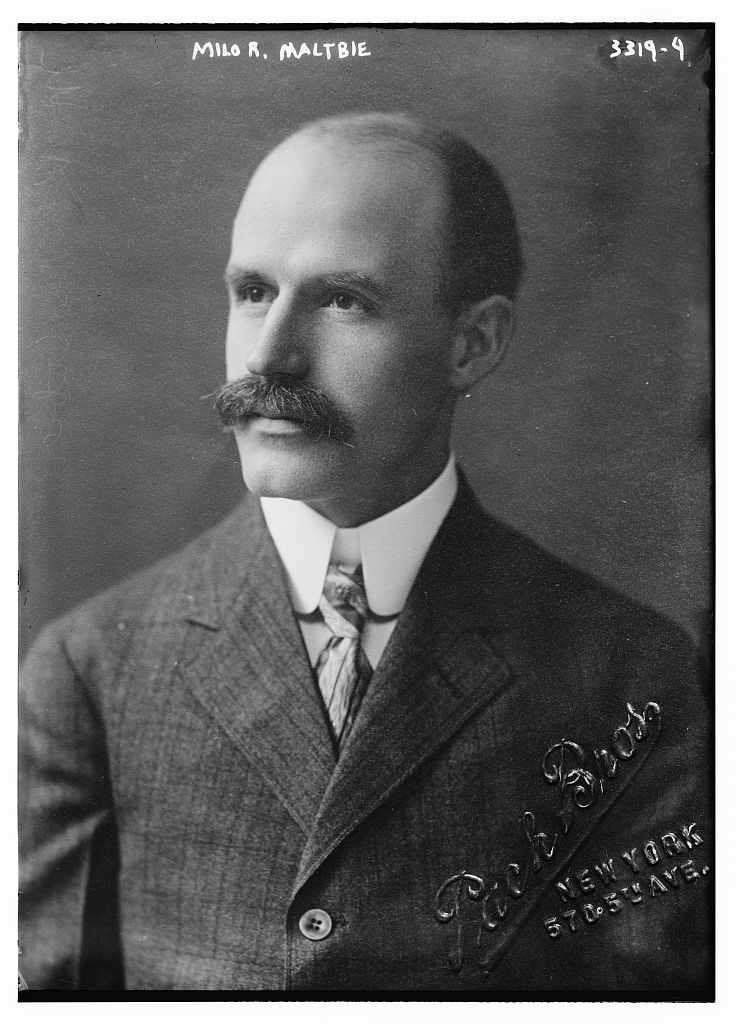
Milo R. Maltbie, Commissioner of the New York State Public Service Commission

Milo Roy Maltbie (born Hinckley, Illinois, April 3, 1871; died New York City, New York, December 22, 1962) was an American economist who specialized in public utilities. He is best known for his service as the chairman of the New York Public Service Commission from 1930 to 1949.

== Early life ==
Maltbie was the third of four children of Henry Munson Maltbie (1836–1902) and his wife Harriet Delano Maltbie (1840–1915). He graduated from Upper Iowa University in 1892, received a Ph.B at Northwestern University in 1893 and a Ph.D. from Columbia University in 1897. He taught economics and mathematics at Mount Morris College in Mount Morris, Illinois from 1893 to 1895. From 1895 to 1897 Maltbie was a fellow in administrative law at Columbia. He was a student of legal scholar Frank Johnson Goodnow there and contributed an article to a 1935 volume of essays in his honor.

== Career ==
Maltbie had become interested in municipal governance; in 1897 he published English Local Government of Today, A Study of the Relations of Central and Local Governments. From 1897 to 1902 Maltbie was the secretary of the City Reform Club in New York City; he travelled to Europe in 1899 to study the problems of municipal governance. He was also the editor of Municipal Affairs, the quarterly publication of the club on civic reform. In 1898 the club published his Municipal Functions; A Study of the Development, Scope and Tendency of Municipal Socialism. In 1901 he edited and contributed to a study of the street railways of Chicago; in the introduction he was referred to as "...a well-known writer on municipal and economic subjects..." Starting in 1901 Maltbie, building on the work of Henry Carter Adams on railroads, developed the idea of the "uniform system of accounts" for utilities, legally-required standards of accounting that required utilities to keep separate detailed records for each distinct part of their operations.

From 1902 to 1907 Maltbie was the secretary of the New York City Art Commission. After another visit to Europe he wrote a report on "Civic Art in Northern Europe: A Report to the Art Commission of the City of New York" in 1903.

In June 1907 Maltbie was appointed to the newly created New York Public Utilities Commission, first division (Greater New York City), by governor Charles Evans Hughes. He was reappointed by successive governors until 1915. In 1916 he was appointed chamberlain of New York City by reform mayor John Purroy Mitchel.

Maltbie was frequently called upon to consult on utility rates and testify in court proceedings involving rate setting. Maltbie served as an advisor to the Federal Electric Railways Commission (1919–1920).

In 1930 Maltbie was appointed as chairman of the reconstituted statewide New York Public Service Commission by governor Franklin Delano Roosevelt, a post he held until 1949.

== Family ==
Maltbie married Lucia McCosh (1869–1957) in 1901; they had no children.

== Legacy ==
Maltbie donated over $500,000 to his alma mater Upper Iowa University in 1960 to build Maltbie-McCosh Hall, a men's dormitory. It was thought at the time to be one of the largest private donations in relation to the size of the university.
