= New Carlisle Historic District =

Historic district in Indiana, United States

- U.S. National Register of Historic Places
- U.S. Historic district
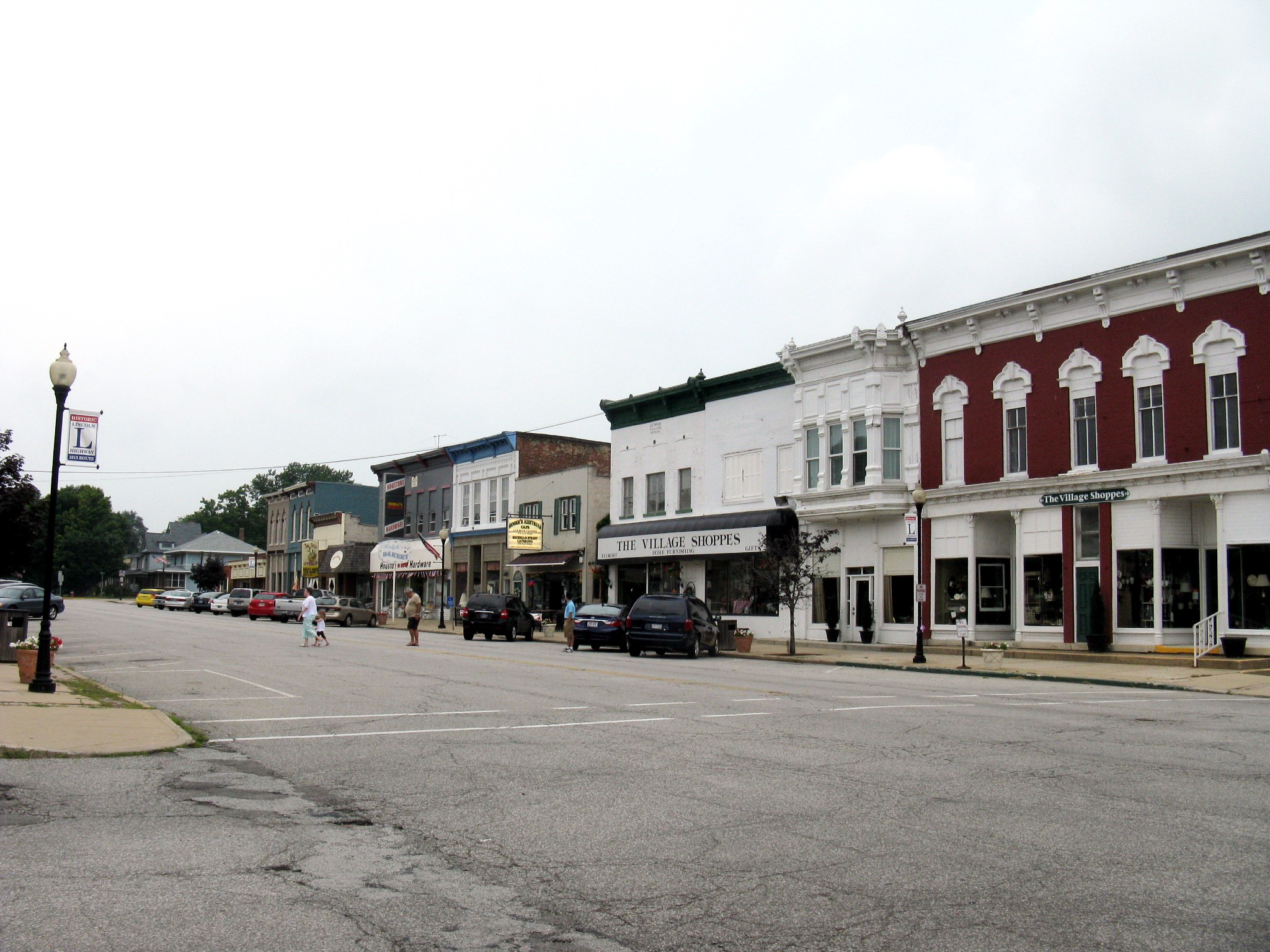

- Location within Indiana Location within the United States
- Location: Roughly bounded by Front, Arch, Chestnut and Bray Sts., New Carlisle, Indiana
- Coordinates: 41°42′21″N 86°30′37″W
- Area: 24 acres (9.7 ha)
- Architectural style: Italianate, Italian Villa, Queen Anne
- NRHP reference No.: 92001653
- Added to NRHP: December 14, 1992

The town of New Carlisle, abutting the LaPorte County line in Olive Township in northwestern St. Joseph County, perches on a hill overlooking the rich Terre Coupee prairie to the east. Its main street, Michigan Street, at forty-five feet is wider than the town's other streets and has been from its platting in 1835 a part of an improved thoroughfare, first the Michigan Road, later the Lincoln Highway and, finally, US 20. Two parallel railroads, Conrail and the electrically powered South Shore, run along the town's north edge at the bottom of the hill, beyond which still lies open farmland. This is largely true to the west and south as well, although in recent years commercial development has occurred at the western edge of town along US 20 at the county line, and some residential development to the south. Along US 20 to the east (toward South Bend) is a long line of ca. 1950 housing development, which until recently edged farmland between the highway and the railroads. Now much of this farmland is zoned industrial, owing largely to the construction less than 2 miles (3.2 km) away of the enormous I/N Tek steel mill, completed in 1990, and its subsidiary I/N Kote, in 1991. The district is the main commercial district on Michigan Street.

== History ==
The town's location on one of the few main improved roads across the state had been enhanced in 1851 when the Lake Shore Railroad (later Lake Shore and Michigan Southern) laid down its tracks through New Carlisle at the bottom of the hill roughly paralleling the Michigan Road that was two to three blocks upwards to the south. In the late 1870s the line was absorbed by the New York Central system, and remained so until recent years, when it became Conrail. After the turn of the century, two interurban companies, the Chicago Lake Shore and South Bend Railway (later the Chicago South Shore and South Bend Railroad) and the Northern Indiana Railway served New Carlisle, running alongside the New York Central tracks. Ihe latter company failed during the Depression and its tracks were removed, but the venerable South Shore continues to this day. As the importance of the railroads and the interurbans began to be challenged by the rise of the automobile. New Carlisle's location on an improved road again contributed to its continuing prosperity. The Lincoln Highway, the first of the privately administered transcontinental roads to be routed in response to a rising public demand for better roads, crossed northern Indiana via Fort Wayne, South Bend, LaPorte, Valparaiso, and Schererville. Essentially completed in 1915, the Lincoln Highway passed through New Carlisle on Michigan Street, the old Michigan Road. In 1919 the newly formed State Highway Commission designated the Lincoln Highway as a "main market road," preparatory to setting up Indiana's state highway system. In the 1920s the federal government laid the foundation for its highway network, and designated the route running through the top row of counties in northern Indiana, which included parts of the old Michigan Road from South Bend to Michigan City, as US 20. Many other small towns along the new highway, such as Rolling Prairie about five miles to the west, were bypassed in the 1920s and 1930s, but New Carlisle was spared, perhaps owing to the topographical difficulties any feasible bypass route would encounter.

== Bibliography ==
- Chapman, Charles C. History of St. Joseph County, Indiana. Chicago, 1880.
- Howard, Timothy Edward. History of St. Joseph County; Chicago, 1907.
- Greiff, Glory-June; "An Overview of Commerce in Indiana, 1679–1890;" 1989. Historic context on file at DHPA.
- Greiff, Glory-June; "An Overview of Transportation in Indiana: 1670–1890." 1990. Historic context on file at DHPA. Historic Preservation Commission of South Bend and St. Joseph County.
- Indiana Historic Sites and Structures Inventory of St. Joseph County. South Bend, 1981.
- Illustrated Historical Atlas of St. Joseph County, Indiana. Chicago, 1875.
- Stoll, J.B. History of St. Joseph County. Volume 3 of Logan Esarey, History of Indiana. Dayton, Ohio, 1927.
- Watt, Marguerite McCord, and Kathlyn V. Wade. New Carlisle: The Story of Our Town. LaPorte, 1956.
