= Federal Electric Railways Commission =

United States agency

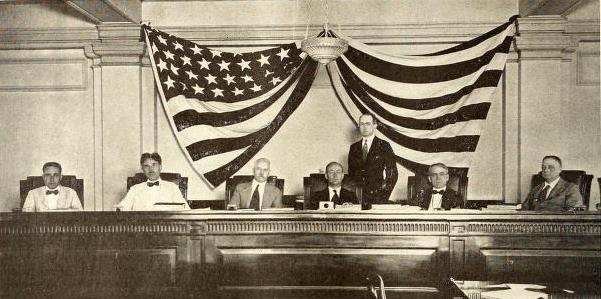
A 1919 meeting of the commission in Washington, D.C.

The Federal Electric Railways Commission was a United States agency established by President Woodrow Wilson in June 1919. The commission was charged with investigating the financial problems of the streetcar and interurban railway industry in the United States. The commission completed its business in July 1920 after submitting a final report to the President.

== Membership ==
The commission members were:

- Charles E. Elmquist, commission chairman. Elmquist was president and general solicitor of the National Association of Railway and Utilities Commissioners
- Edwin F. Sweet, vice chairman of the commission; Assistant Secretary of Commerce
- Philip H. Gadsden, American Electric Railway Association
- Royal Meeker, Commissioner of Labor Statistics
- Louis B. Wehle, General Counsel of the War Finance Corporation
- Charles W. Beall, representing the Investment Bankers' Association of America
- William D. Mahon, president of Amalgamated Association of Street and Electric Railway Employees of America
- George Luis Baker, mayor of Portland, Oregon.

Charlton Greenwood Ogburn served as Executive Secretary to the commission.

== Testimony and investigation ==
The commission conducted public hearings from June to October 1919. In addition to receiving witness testimony, the commission sent questionnaires to electric railway companies, local governments, state public utility commissions and railway labor unions; and obtained reports on specialized topics. Local government experts Delos F. Wilcox and Milo R. Maltbie analyzed the data obtained and served as advisors to the commissioners.

== Final report ==
The commission submitted its final report to the President, thereby completing its business, in July 1920.

Among the 23 conclusions and recommendations in the final report are the following:

- "The electric railway industry as it now exists is without financial credit and is not properly performing its public function."
- "This condition is the result of early financial mismanagement and economic causes accentuated by existing high-price levels of labor and materials, and of the failure of the uniform unit fare of 5 cents prescribed either by statute or by local franchise ordinances or contracts to provide the necessary revenues to pay operating costs and to maintain the property upon a reasonable basis."
- "The industry can be restored to a normal basis only by the introduction of economies in operation, improving the tracks, equipment, and service, and assuring a reasonable return upon the fair value of its property used in the public service when honestly and efhciently managed."
- "The great increase in the use of private automobiles, the jitney, and motor busses has introduced a serious although not a fatal, competition to the electric railway. These forms of public motor conveyance when operated as public carriers should properly be subject to equivalent regulatory provisions."
- "A private industry should not be subsidized by public funds unless it is imperatively necessary for the preservation of an essential service, and then only as an emergency measure."
- "While eventually it might become expedient for the public to own and operate electric railways, there is nothing in the experience thus far obtained in this country that will justify the assertion that it will result in better or cheaper service than privately operated utilities could afford if properly regulated."

Delos Wilcox, who had reviewed the commission's accumulated testimony and other data, criticized the commission's final report because it did not support a recommendation for municipal ownership of the railways as an alternative solution. He had submitted an 823 page report to the commission on June 8, 1920, including his analysis and recommendations for public ownership, but this information was not included in the commission's final report to the President. Later in 1920 he publicly stated that private ownership of electric railways had been a failure in the United States, while public ownership was widespread in the United Kingdom.

=== Independent report by Wilcox ===
In 1921 Wilcox published his report independently. The report, titled "Analysis of the Electric Railway Problem", stated, "My analysis of the evidence presented to the Federal Electric Railways Commission confirmed me in the opinion that no permanent solution of the electric railway problem, consistent with the public interest, is possible except in public ownership. I advised the Commission that the most important thing to be done at the present time is frankly to recognize the necessity of public ownership and operation as an ultimate policy and to concentrate eflfort upon plans for the removal of obstacles in its way and for the assurance of its success when undertaken... The final solution of the problem, as I see it, lies in the full recognition of public responsibility for local transportation and in the acceptance by the community of the primary obligation of self-help in the performance of this all-important community service."

== Aftermath ==
The fortunes of the interurban industry in the US declined during World War I and into the early 1920s. Many financially weak interurbans did not survive the prosperous 1920s, and most others went bankrupt during the Great Depression, along with many streetcar systems.

== See also ==
- Public transportation in the United States
