= William B. Munro =

Canadian historian and political scientist

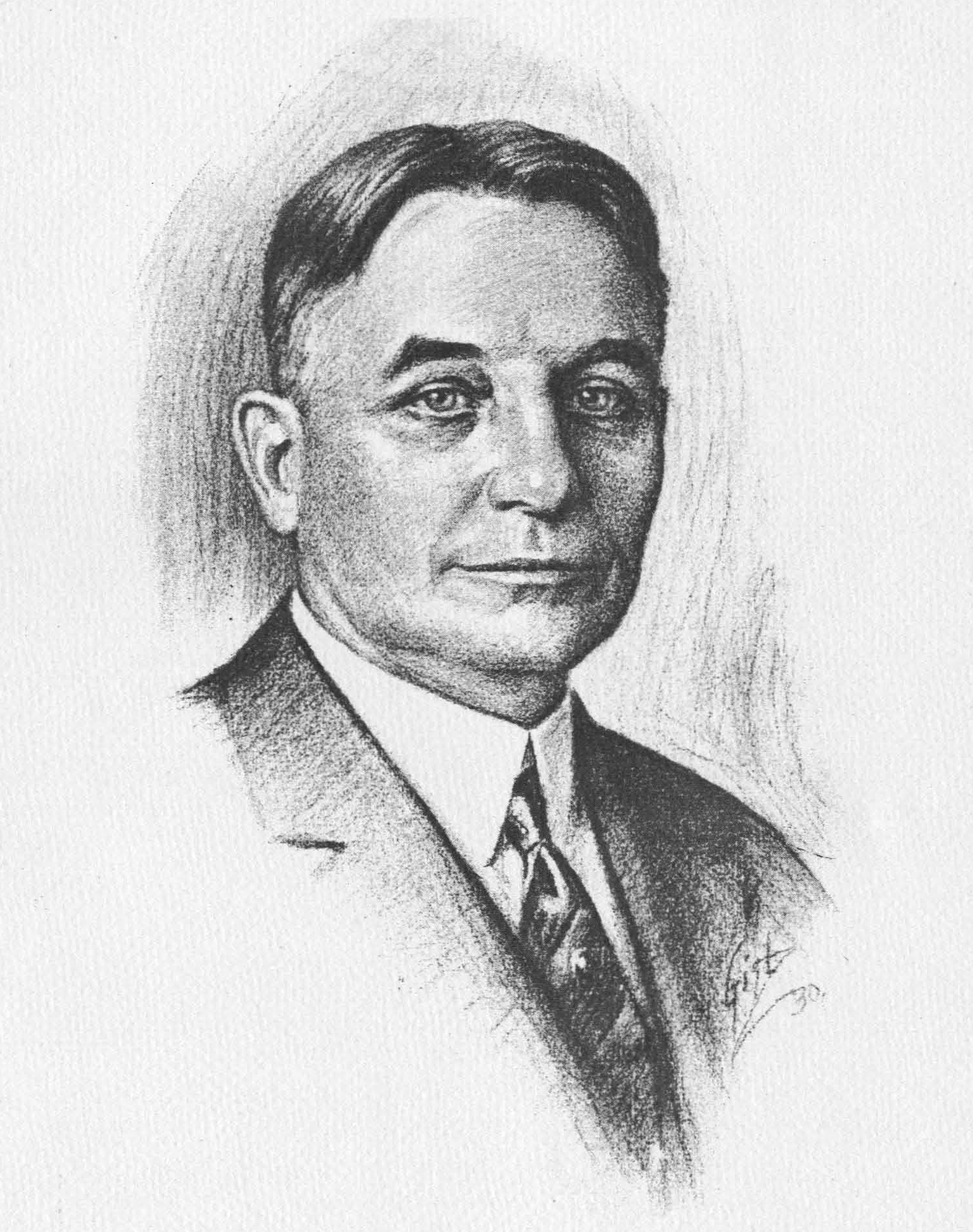
- 1931 drawing of William Bennett Munro
- Born: William Bennett Munro; 5 January 1875; Almonte, Ontario, Canada
- Died: 4 September 1957 (aged 82); Pasadena, California, United States
- Occupations: Historian; Political scientist
- Spouse: Caroline Munro

William Bennett Munro (5 January 1875 – 4 September 1957) was a Canadian historian and political scientist. He taught at Harvard University and the California Institute of Technology. He was known for research on the seigneurial system in New France and on municipal administration in the United States.

== Name removal at Caltech ==
In February 2021, Caltech decided to take William B. Munro's name off one of its buildings because he supported and practiced eugenics, which is a belief that certain people are better than others based on their genes on a scientific and racial level. The building was called the Division of Humanities and Social Sciences, but it was renamed the Hameetman Center. Caltech made this decision as part of an effort to recognize and address its past connection to eugenics, which has hurt many people through discrimination and damage to marginalized communities. The president of Caltech, Thomas F. Rosenbaum, said that removing Munro's name reflects the university's commitment to including everyone and recognizing its institutional history.

Munro was an advocate for eugenics, a theory that aimed to improve the genetic quality of the human population through selective breeding and sterilization. Munro argued that the "superior" races should have more children and the "inferior" races should have fewer children, and he supported laws that allowed for involuntary sterilization.

While Munro's legacy is complicated by his support of eugenics, he also made contributions to the field of political science. He authored several books and articles on political theory, international relations, and American government, and he served as president of the American Political Science Association in 1940.

His name is still used by Stanford University as an endowed position for political professorship, with three professors holding the position as of 2023.

== Works ==
- 1900 The droit de banalité during the French régime in Canada
- 1904 The Revolution
- 1905 "Canada and British North America. The history of North America, vol. 11
- 1906 "The office of intendant in New France: a study in French Colonial policy". In: The American Historical Review, Volume 12, no. 1, October 1906.
- 1907 Some Merits and Defects of the French Colonial System
- 1907 The Galveston Plan of City Government
- 1907 The seigniorial system in Canada : a study in French colonial policy
- 1908 Documents Relating to Seigneurial Tenure in Canada, 1598–1894, as part of the Champlain Society's General Series
- 1909 "The custom of Paris in the New World", excerpted from Juristische Festgabe des Auslandes zu Joseph Kohlers 60. Geburtstag, Stuttgart, 1909
- 1912 The Initiative, Referendum and Recall
- 1914 Selections from the Federalist, edited with an introd. by William Bennett Munro
- 1915 A Bibliography of Municipal Government in the United States
- 1915 The seigneurs of old Canada : a chronicle of New-World feudalism
- 1916 Principles and Methods of Municipal Administration, Macmillan
- 1918 Crusaders of New France: a chronicle of the Fleur-de-lis in the wilderness
- 1919 Public Ownership of Public Utilities 1919, with Samuel Orace Dunn, John Martin, and Delos Franklin Wilcox
- 1919 Government of the United States (5 editions, 2 title changes through 1946)
- 1923 Municipal Government and Administration
- 1926 A selected bibliography on municipal government in Great Britain
- 1927 The Money Power in Politics
- 1927 The Resurgence of Autocracy
- 1928 The Invisible Government, and Personality in Politics
- 1929 American Influences on Canadian Government
- 1930 American Government To-day
- 1930 The Constitution of the United States
- 1931 The Government of Europe: Supplement
- 1932 The Significance of Our State and Local Elections
- 1932 The Government of European Cities
- 1934 Municipal Administration
- 1934 Personality in Politics
- 1935 The New Philippine Commonwealth
