= Taylor County School District =

School district in Georgia (U.S. state)

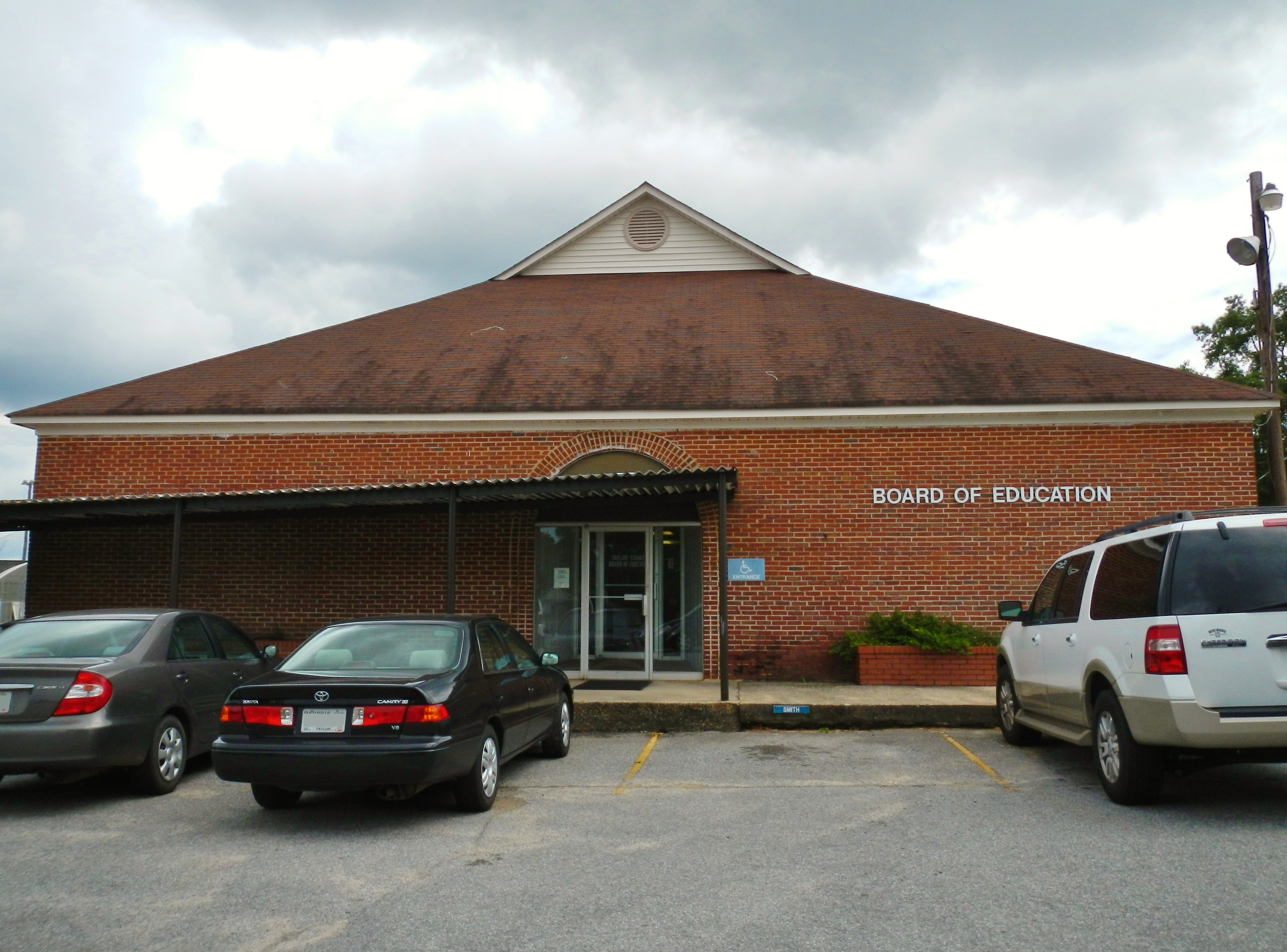

Address
- 229 Mulberry Street Butler, Georgia, 31006; United States
- Coordinates: 32.553991°N 84.236406°W

District information
- Grades: Pre-school - 12
- Superintendent: Jennifer Albritton
- Accreditations: Southern Association of Colleges and Schools; Georgia Accrediting Commission

Students and staff
- Enrollment: 1,735
- Faculty: 101

Other information
- Telephone: (478) 862-5224
- Website: www.taylorcountyschools.org

The Taylor County School District is a public school district in Taylor County, Georgia, United States, based in Butler. It serves the communities of Butler and Reynolds.

== Schools ==
The Taylor County School District has two elementary schools, one middle school, and one high school.

=== Elementary schools ===
- Taylor County Primary School
- Taylor County Upper Elementary

=== Middle school ===
- Taylor County Middle School

=== High school ===
- Taylor County High School
