= Delos Franklin Wilcox =

American government official and author

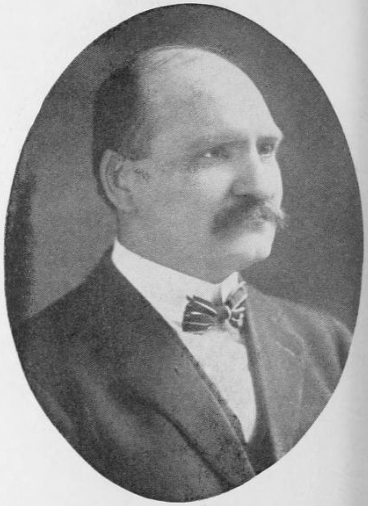
- Born: April 22, 1873; Ida, Michigan, US
- Died: April 4, 1928 (aged 54); New York, New York, US
- Education: University of Michigan; Columbia University
- Occupations: Civil servant, writer, editor
- Spouse: Mina Gates (m. 1898)
- Children: 4

Delos Franklin Wilcox (April 22, 1873 – April 4, 1928) was a United States expert on municipal government.

== Biography ==
Delos Franklin Wilcox was born in Ida, Michigan on April 22, 1873. He graduated from the University of Michigan in 1894, having been strongly influenced by John Dewey. He took the degree of Ph.D. at Columbia University in 1896. He edited the Detroit Civic News from 1905 to 1907. From 1907 to 1913 he was chief of the bureau of franchises in the first district of the New York Civil Service Commission. From 1914 to 1917 he was deputy commissioner of the New York department of water supply, gas and electricity. In 1919-20 he served as an advisor to the Federal Electric Railways Commission.

Wilcox died in New York City on April 4, 1928.

== Personal ==
He married Mina Gates in 1898, and four children survived him. He had an orchard at Elk Rapids, Michigan, which he gave much attention in later years.

== Works ==
He was a recognized authority on municipal government and wrote extensively on the subject. His works include:

- Municipal Government in Michigan and Ohio, his Ph.D. thesis (1896)
- The Study of City Government (1897)
- Ethical Marriage (1900)
- The American City (1904)
- The Government of Great American Cities (1908)
- Municipal Franchises (2 vols., 1910–11)
- Great Cities in America: Their Problems and Their Government (1910)
- Government by all the People (1912)
- Public Ownership of Public Utilities (1919), with William Bennett Munro, John Martin, and Samuel Orace Dunn
- Analysis of the Electric Railway Problem (1921)
- Depreciation in Public Utilities (1925)
- The Indeterminate Permit in Relation to Home Rule and Public Ownership (1926)
- The Administration of Municipally Owned Utilities, a pamphlet outlining a work in progress at his death (1931)
