= Samuel Orace Dunn =

Samuel Orace Dunn (March 8, 1877 – January 4, 1958) was an American businessman and magazine editor, specializing in transportation.

== Biography ==
Dunn was born in Bloomfield, Iowa, on March 8, 1877. He began to set type at the age of 12. He learned the printing trade after graduating from high school, was editor of the Quitman (Mo.) Record (1895–1896) and associate editor of the Maryville (Mo.) Tribune (1896–1900). From 1900 to 1904, he worked as a reporter, and later editorial writer, for the Kansas City Journal (in Kansas City, Missouri), and in 1904 to 1907 was connected with the Chicago Tribune as railroad editor and editorial writer. In 1907, he became managing editor of Railway Age (then named Railroad Age Gazette), and its editor four years later. He remained editor-in-chief of the then-weekly magazine for 37 years, from 1911 to 1948. He also contributed articles to several other periodicals and lectured frequently on transportation subjects and was an outspoken advocate on behalf of the railroad industry. In 1931, Dunn was elected chairman of the board and chief executive officer of Simmons-Boardman Publishing Corporation, having previously served as one of the company's vice-presidents. He retired as board chairman in 1950.

At the time of his death he was the chairman emeritus of Simmons-Boardman Publishing Corporation. He wrote:

- American Transportation Question (1912)
- Government Ownership of Railways (1913)
- Railway Regulation or Ownership? (1918)
- Public Ownership of Public Utilities (1919), with William Bennett Munro, John Martin, and Delos Franklin Wilcox

"Sam Dunn Day" was held at the Chicago Railroad Fair on August 16, 1948, to commemorate his contributions to the railroad industry. He was referred to as "Uncle Orace" from his middle name by nephews. The middle name was used by other male family members, but the origin of the name is unknown.

Dunn died on January 4, 1958, at Grant Hospital in Chicago.
