= Frederick Roy Duncan =

American architect

Frederick Roy Duncan (April 17, 1886 – May 10, 1947), often known as F. Roy Duncan, was an engineer and architect. His architectural practice was based in Columbus, Georgia, where he was born in 1886 and where he is buried (in historic Linwood Cemetery).

== Education, personal life, and career ==
He attended Columbus' public schools (segregated), then Alabama Polytechnic Institute in Auburn, Alabama, graduating in 1907 with a Bachelor of Science. He was married in 1908 to Lillian Eason, of Columbus; the couple had no children. Duncan apprenticed at Westinghouse Electric Mfg. Co. in Pittsburgh, Pennsylvania. In 1910 he began work related to the Panama Canal: assembling and "putting into operation" various electric equipment, then designing switchboards for the Gatun power plant, for power distribution, and for lighting; then designing other electrical, mechanical and structural elements.

In 1913 he began the practice of Architecture in Columbus and maintained such business for a period of thirty-four years until his death. His professional work lives after him in the form of numerous structures consisting of residential, commercial and institutional as well as large scale housing, all bearing silent, eloquent testimony to his skill as a designer and his talent in the field of structural creation. Dignity and beauty characterize these public buildings, their design combining both utility and distinction, often with original touches that quickly reveal their authorship. He scrupulously adhered to the ethics of his profession and his standing with his brother architects was very high. He designed and built "Duncan Hall" at Spring Haven, his country estate, on the River Road, in 1940-1942, on the site of an original log house he had maintained as a summer home since 1922. He was a member of St. Paul Methodist Church, Georgia Society of Historical Research, Charter member of Kiwanis Club and formerly a member of the Columbus Country Club. His wife was the President of the Georgia Division of United Daughters of the Confederacy in 1946-1947. His favorite diversion was fishing and it was on one of his loved fishing trips that his final summons came. In the quiet of a beautiful spot, while returning from Standing Boy Creek, which flows through his estate, he was stricken with a heart attack and his quiet, sweet life came to its close. He was buried in Linwood Cemetery in Columbus.

== Personal ==
He was married in 1908 to Lillian Eason, of Columbus; the couple had no children.

== Works ==
His works include:

- 933 Peachtree Drive (1923), Muscogee, Georgia, one of five contributing buildings designed by Duncan in NRHP-listed Wynn's Hill-Overlook-Oak Circle Historic District. This has been described as "An excellent example of a Mediterranean Revival-style house" (photograph 10) It "resembles an Italian villa with its stuccoed exterior, grouped windows with arched detailing, recessed entrance with an arch supported by Tuscan columns, and tile hip roof with exposed rafters."
- 809 Cooper Avenue (1927), Muscogee, Georgia, in NRHP-listed Wynn's Hill-Overlook-Oak Circle Historic District
- 839 Cooper Avenue (1927), Muscogee, Georgia, in NRHP-listed Wynn's Hill-Overlook-Oak Circle Historic District
- 842 Cooper Avenue (1927), Muscogee, Georgia, in NRHP-listed Wynn's Hill-Overlook-Oak Circle Historic District
- 1331 Elmwood Drive (1927), Muscogee, Georgia, in NRHP-listed Wynn's Hill-Overlook-Oak Circle Historic District
- 1930 additions to the City Stockade
- Taylor County Courthouse (1935), in Butler, Georgia. It is a Neoclassical Revival-style building that was designed by Columbus, Georgia architect Frederick Roy Duncan. Classical elements in the design that are more prominent than usual for courthouses built during the Great Depression include its cupola, pedimented portico and entrances, quoins, and keystones.
- One or more works in Dinglewood Historic District, Bounded by 13th and 16th Ave., 13th St., and Wynnton Rd. Columbus, Georgia Duncan, F. Roy, et al.
- One or more works in Butler Downtown Historic district, Downtown Butler centered on the courthouse square and includes resources on Main St., Broad St. and Ivey ST. Butler, GA Duncan, Frederick Roy
- Claflin School, NRHP-listed in 2015 "a rare example of a well-built African-American school constructed before the landmark 1954 U.S. Supreme Court ruling in Brown v. Board of Education"
- First African Baptist Church, Columbus, Georgia, addition of auditorium and Sunday School
- Work announced in American Architect notice
