= Taylor County High School (Georgia) =

Public high school in Butler, Georgia, United States

Coordinates: 32.5541°N 84.2325°W

Location
- 24 Oak Street; Butler, Georgia 31006

Information
- School type: Public
- Established: 1956
- School district: Taylor County School District
- NCES District ID: 1304800
- Superintendent: Jennifer Albriton
- NCES School ID: 130480002440
- Principal: Lilia Parks
- Grades: 9-12
- Enrollment: 366
- Student to teacher ratio: 12.41
- Colors: Blue, gold, and white
- Mascot: Vikings
- Website: https://www.taylorcountyschools.org/o/tchs

Taylor County High School is a public high school in Butler, Georgia, and the only public high school in the rural county. It is in the Taylor County School District. Vikings are the school mascot and the school colors are blue, gold, and white.

It was preceded by Butler Female College and Male Institute.

In 1955 Mauk School was consolidated into Taylor High School. The old school building turned community center is listed on the National Register of Historic Places. Reynolds High School in Reynolds, Georgia was consolidated into it in the 1960s.

Byrd v. United States was described as a case of six "Negro" students being assigned, against their wishes, to a school with a white student body. In 1969, the school district was put under court jurisdiction. The student body of schools in recent decades has been roughly evenly split between whites and blacks.

From 1967-1972 the Lady Vikings basketball team never lost a game. The team won 132 games and five state championships.

The school's first integrated prom was held in 2003.

== Alumni ==
- Derrick Wimbush

== See also ==
- National Register of Historic Places listings in Taylor County, Georgia
