= Electric Railway Journal =

Defunct magazine dedicated to public transportation

- Categories: Transport
- Frequency: Weekly (1908–1929); Monthly (1929–1931)
- Publisher: McGraw Hill
- First issue: June 1908
- Final issue: December 1931
- Country: United States
- Based in: New York
- Language: American English
- ISSN: 0095-9715

Electric Railway Journal was an American magazine primarily about electric urban rail transit in North America, published by McGraw Hill from June 1908 until December 1931. It was founded when publications Street Railway Journal (first published November 1884) and Electric Railway Review (first published January 1891) merged. Initially published weekly, it became monthly in April 1929. The magazine ceased publishing under this name in December 1931; it was renamed Transit Journal.
