= Taylor County Courthouse (Georgia) =

- U.S. National Register of Historic Places
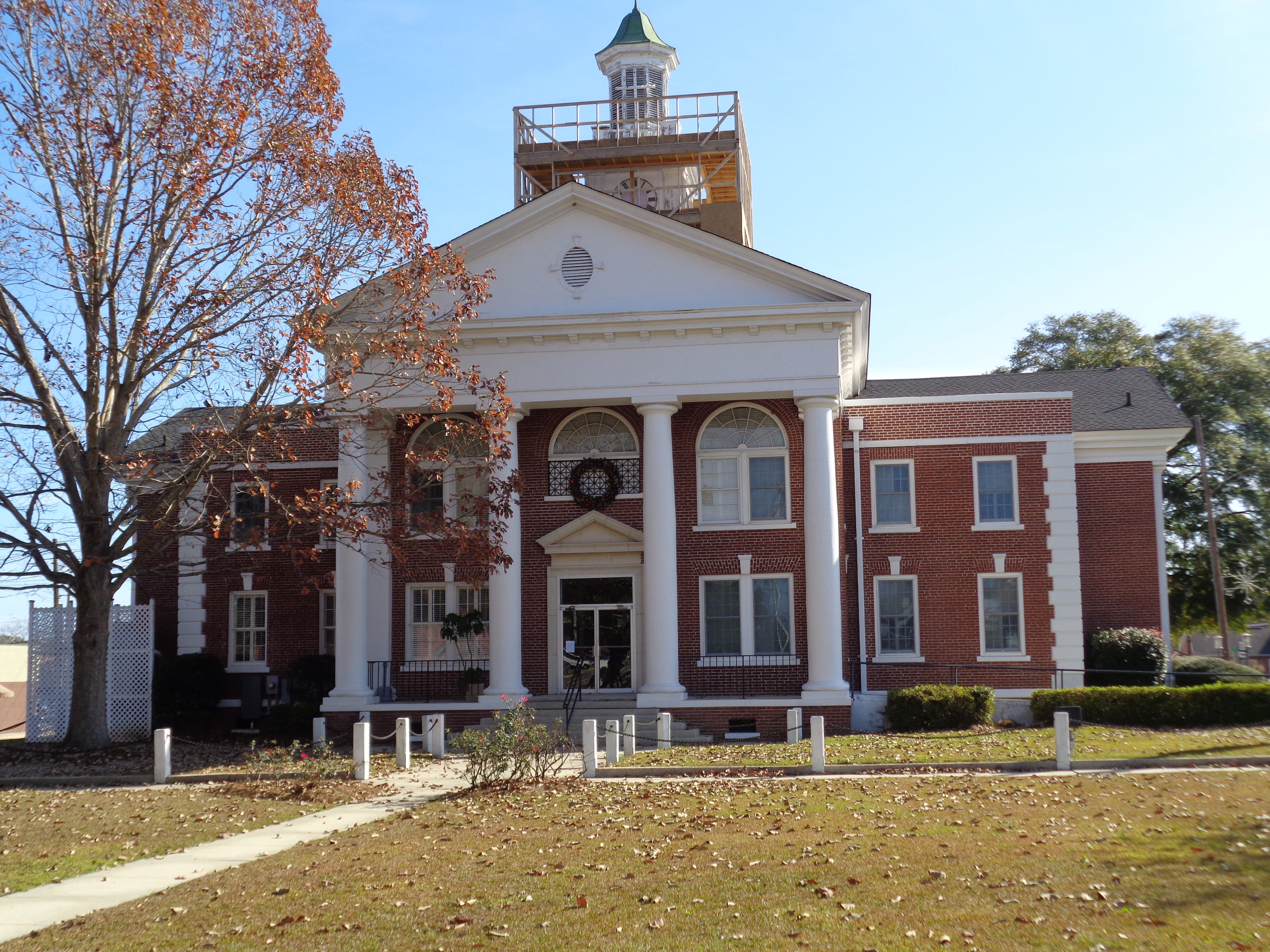
- Taylor County Courthouse in 2015.

- Location within Georgia Location within the United States
- Location: Main St., Butler, Georgia
- Coordinates: 32°33′25″N 84°14′15″W
- Built: 1935
- Architect: Duncan, Frederick Roy
- Architectural style: Classical Revival, Colonial Revival
- MPS: Georgia County Courthouses TR
- NRHP reference No.: 95000719
- Added to NRHP: June 14, 1995

Taylor County Courthouse in Butler, Georgia was built in 1935. It is a Neoclassical Revival-style building that was designed by Columbus, Georgia architect Frederick Roy Duncan. Classical elements in the design that are more prominent than usual for courthouses built during the Great Depression include its cupola, pedimented portico and entrances, quoins, and keystones.

The current courthouse replaced the first courthouse of Taylor County which had been built in 1852 on the same site, remaining in use for almost 80 years. The demolition of the first courthouse by convict labor began in 1934.

The courthouse was listed on the National Register of Historic Places in 1995.
