= Butler, Georgia =

- City
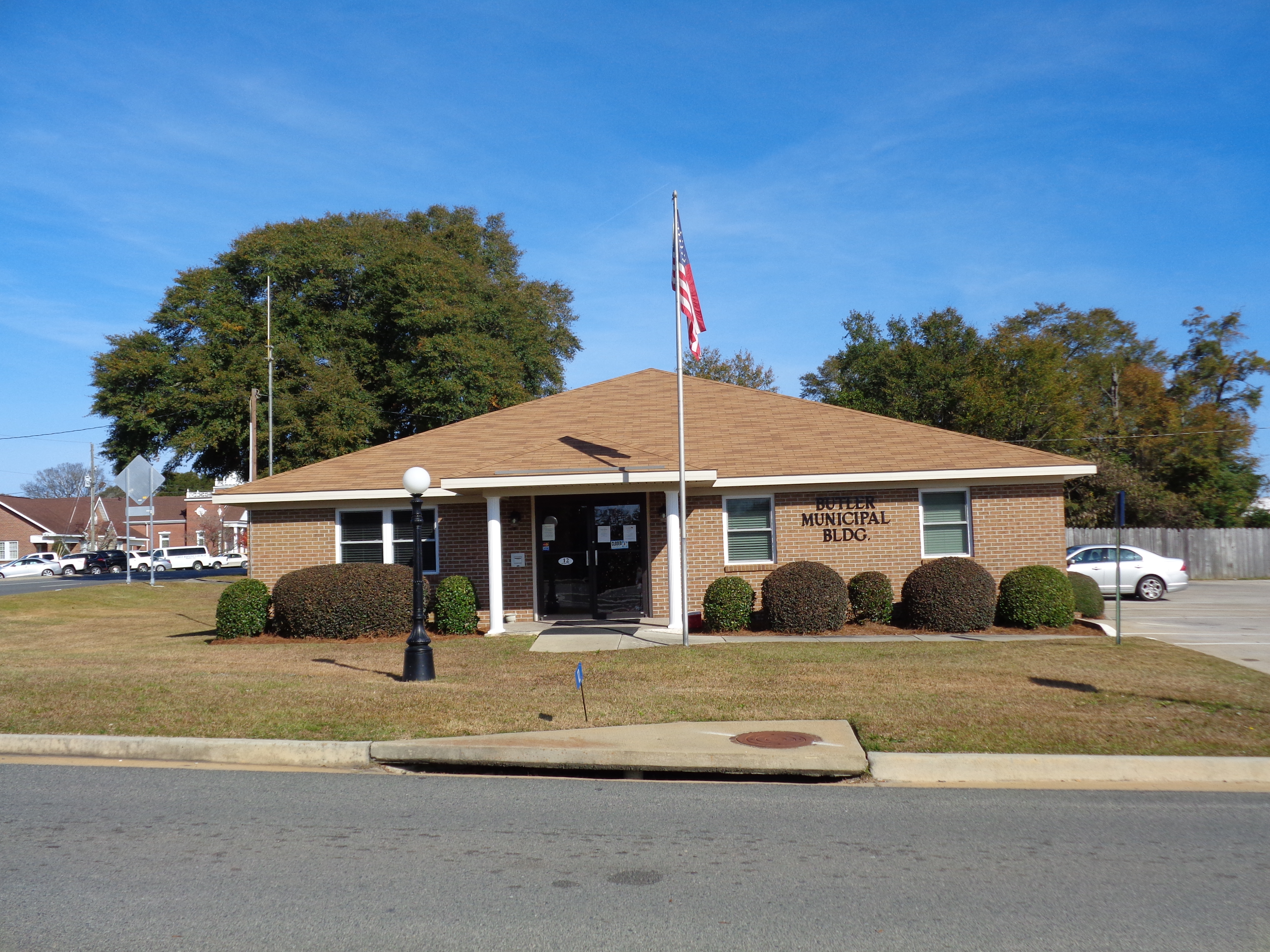
- Butler Municipal Building (aka City Hall)

- Location in Taylor County and the state of Georgia
- Coordinates: 32°33′N 84°14′W
- Country: United States
- State: Georgia
- County: Taylor

Area
  - Total: 3.26 sq mi (8.45 km^{2})
  - Land: 3.25 sq mi (8.41 km^{2})
  - Water: 0.015 sq mi (0.04 km^{2})
- Elevation: 627 ft (191 m)

Population (2020)
  - Total: 1,881
  - Density: 579.5/sq mi (223.73/km^{2})
- Time zone: UTC-5 (Eastern (EST))
  - Summer (DST): UTC-4 (EDT)
- ZIP code: 31006
- Area code: 478
- FIPS code: 13-12120
- GNIS feature ID: 0312093
- Website: www.cityofbutlerga.com

Butler is the county seat of Taylor County, Georgia, United States. Its population was 1,972 at the 2010 census, and 1,881 in 2020.

== History ==
The Central of Georgia Railway was built through the present area of Butler about 1850. The line is currently owned by Norfolk Southern and hosts three to four trains per day.

Butler was incorporated on February 8, 1854, but the charter was not received until 1870. Taylor County was carved from the Creek Indian territory which had in earlier years become the counties of Marion, Talbot, and Macon.

The chosen location of Butler was known as the "Fifty Mile Station" on the railroad because it was the geographical center of the railroad between Macon and Columbus, Georgia. Each town is approximately 50 miles (80 km) in either direction of Butler.

The city of Butler, Georgia, was named for General William Orlando Butler, a distinguished soldier of the Mexican–American War and a candidate for Vice President on the ticket with General Lewis Cass of Michigan.

In late 2016, a 1070-acre 103 megawatt solar panel facility was completed. The Butler Solar Facility is owned by First Solar.

== Geography ==
Butler is located at 32°33′N 84°14′W (32.557, -84.239).

The city is located along U.S. Route 19, which is the main route through the city. U.S. 19 leads north 28 mi (45 km) to Thomaston and south 24 mi (39 km) to Ellaville. The Fall Line Freeway (GA-540) runs from west to east through the southern part of the city, concurrent with Georgia State Route 96. GA-540 and GA-96 lead east 9 mi (14 km) to Reynolds and west 14 mi (23 km) to Junction City. Georgia State Route 137 also runs through the city, leading northeast 20 mi (32 km) to Roberta and southwest 25 mi (40 km) to Buena Vista.

According to the United States Census Bureau, the city has a total area of 3.2 square miles (8.3 km^{2}), of which 3.2 square miles (8.3 km^{2}) is land and 0.31% is water.

== Demographics ==
Historical population
Census	Pop.	Note	%±
1890	712		—
1900	707		−0.7%
1910	705		−0.3%
1920	758		7.5%
1930	857		13.1%
1940	1,093		27.5%
1950	1,182		8.1%
1960	1,346		13.9%
1970	1,589		18.1%
1980	1,959		23.3%
1990	1,673		−14.6%
2000	1,907		14.0%
2010	1,972		3.4%
2020	1,881		−4.6%
U.S. Decennial Census

=== 2020 census ===
As of the 2020 census, Butler had a population of 1,881, with 756 households and 447 families residing in the city.

The median age was 43.3 years. 23.4% of residents were under the age of 18 and 22.8% were 65 years of age or older. For every 100 females, there were 80.3 males, and for every 100 females age 18 and over, there were 72.2 males age 18 and over.

0.0% of residents lived in urban areas, while 100.0% lived in rural areas.

Of households in Butler, 31.1% had children under the age of 18 living in them. Of all households, 29.0% were married-couple households, 17.6% were households with a male householder and no spouse or partner present, and 47.8% were households with a female householder and no spouse or partner present. About 36.3% of all households were made up of individuals, and 16.1% had someone living alone who was 65 years of age or older.

There were 870 housing units, of which 13.1% were vacant. The homeowner vacancy rate was 0.8% and the rental vacancy rate was 6.9%.

Butler racial composition as of 2020
Race	Num.	Perc.
White (non-Hispanic)	810	43.06%
Black or African American (non-Hispanic)	986	52.42%
Native American	6	0.32%
Asian	4	0.21%
Pacific Islander	1	0.05%
Other/mixed	50	2.66%
Hispanic or Latino	24	1.28%

== Education ==
=== Taylor County School District ===
The Taylor County School District holds pre-school to grade twelve, and consists of two elementary schools, a middle school, and a high school. The district has 101 full-time teachers and over 1,735 students.

- Taylor County Primary School
- Taylor County Upper Elementary
- Taylor County Middle School
- Taylor County High School

The Taylor County Girls' basketball team (1967–1972) holds the record for the nation's longest girl's high school basketball winning streak by winning 132 consecutive games, going undefeated for five years and winning five back-to-back state championships.

== Notable people ==
- Ella Little-Collins, civil rights activist

== Gallery ==
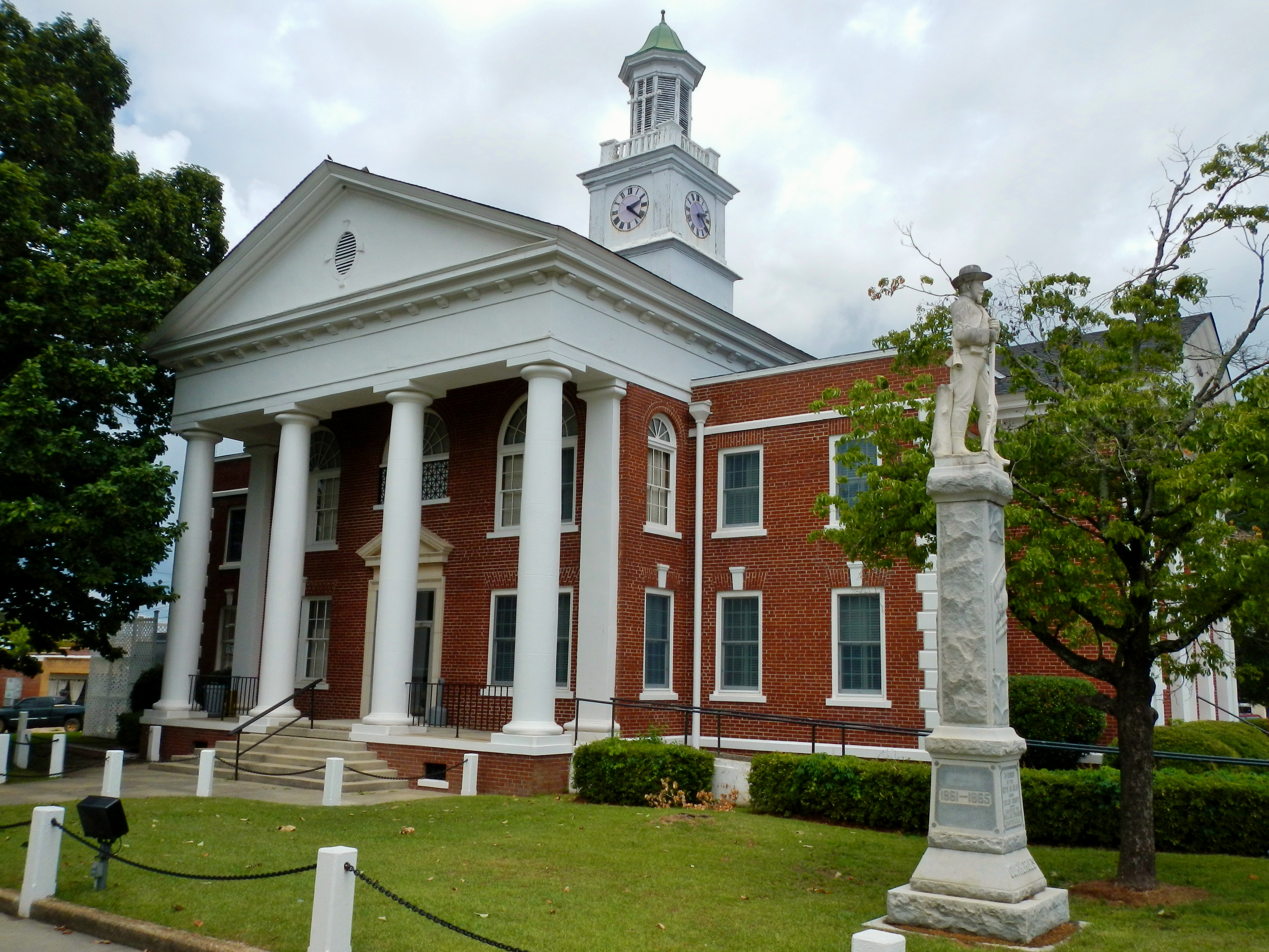
Taylor County Courthouse was built in Butler in 1935. It was listed on the National Register of Historic Places on June 14, 1995.

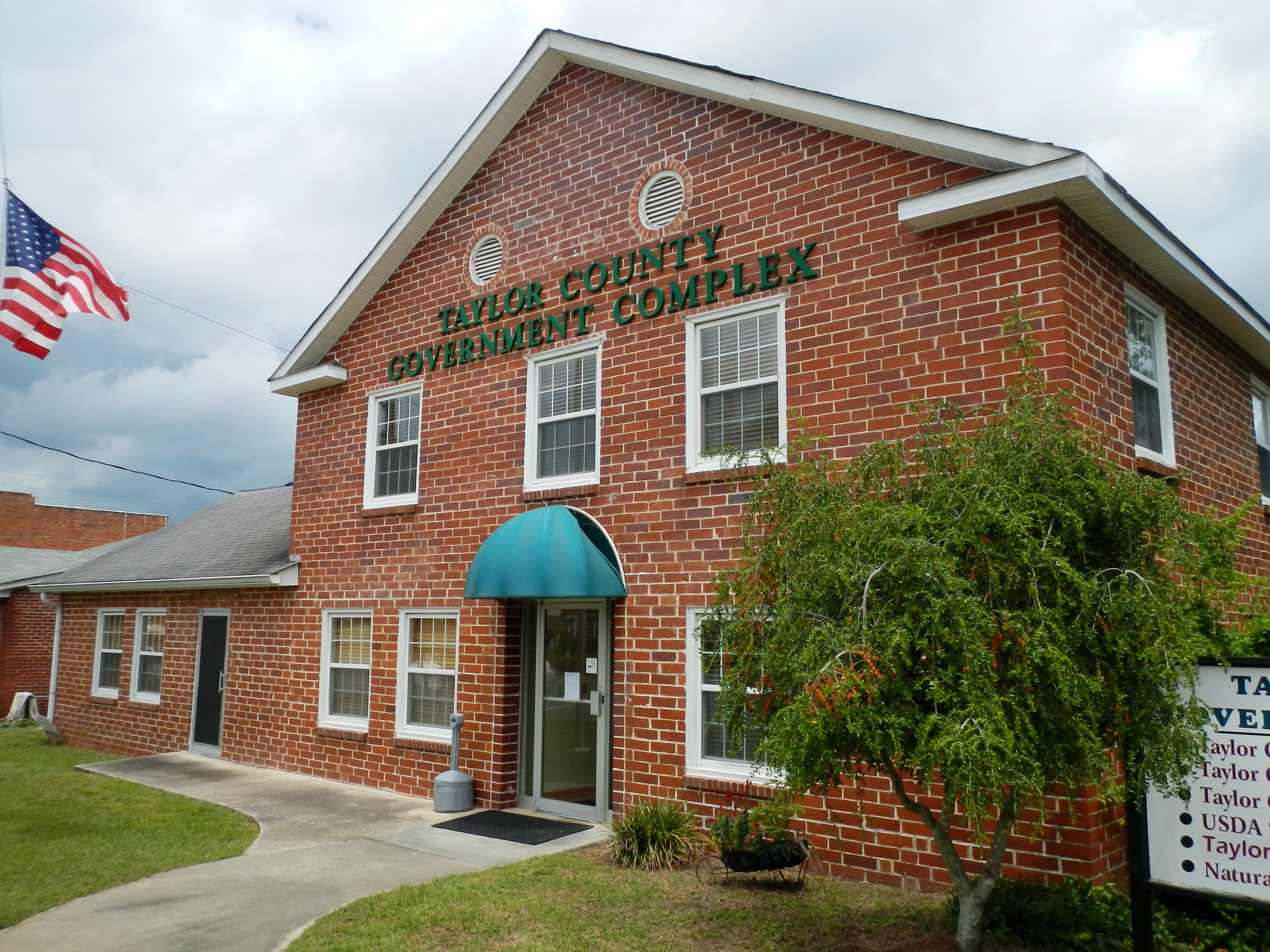
Taylor County Government Complex

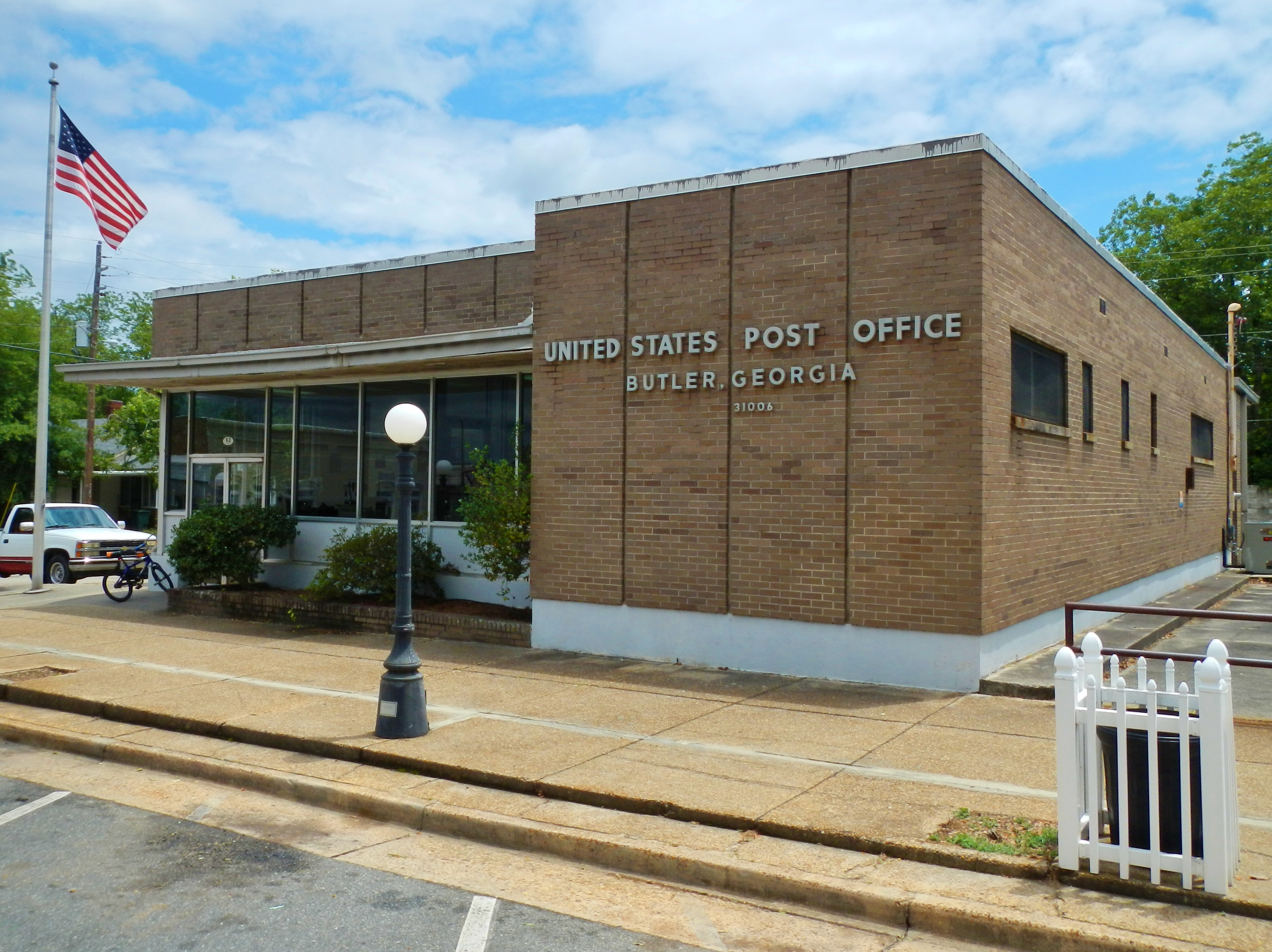
Butler Post Office (ZIP code: 31006)

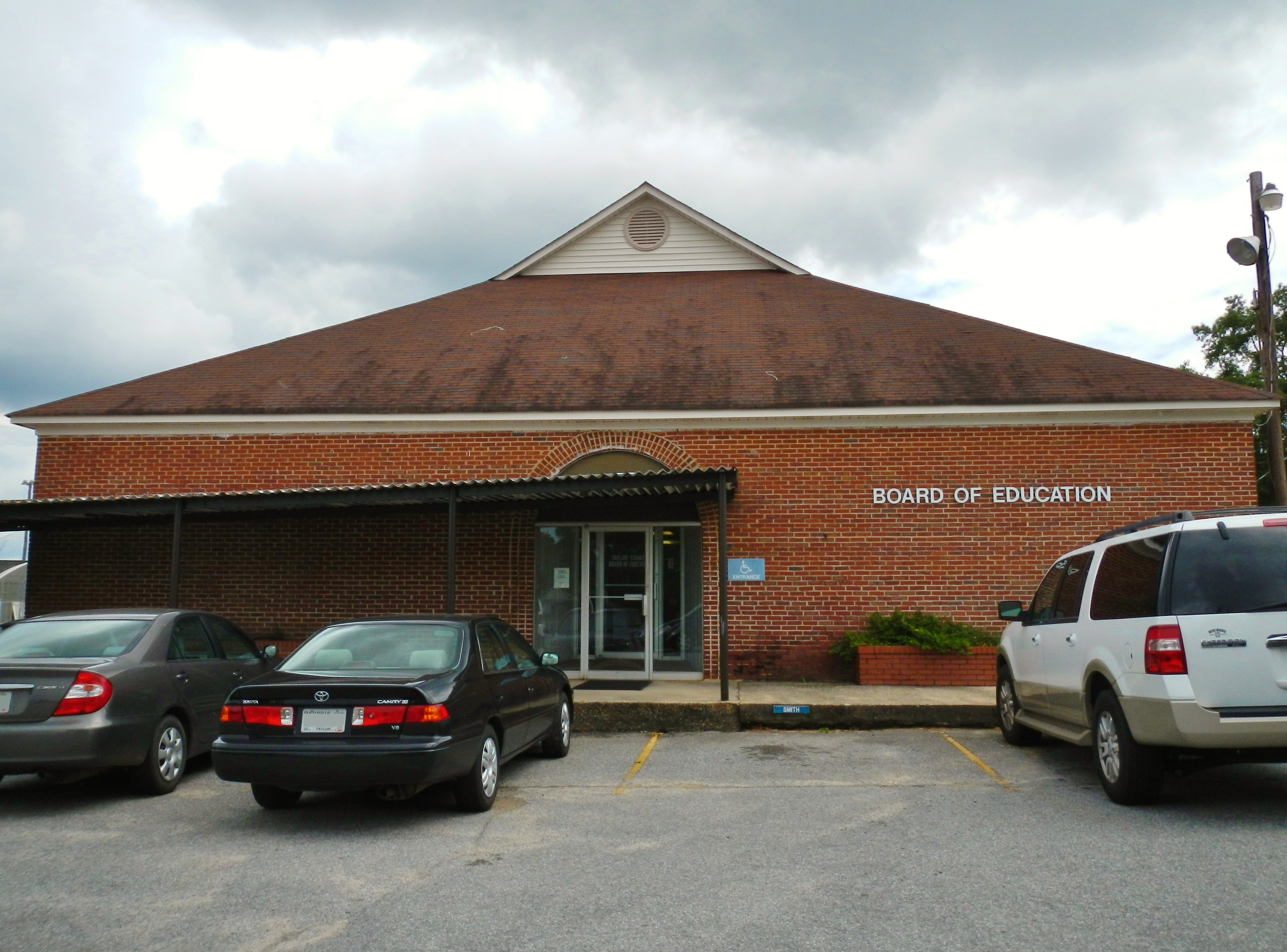
Taylor County Board of Education

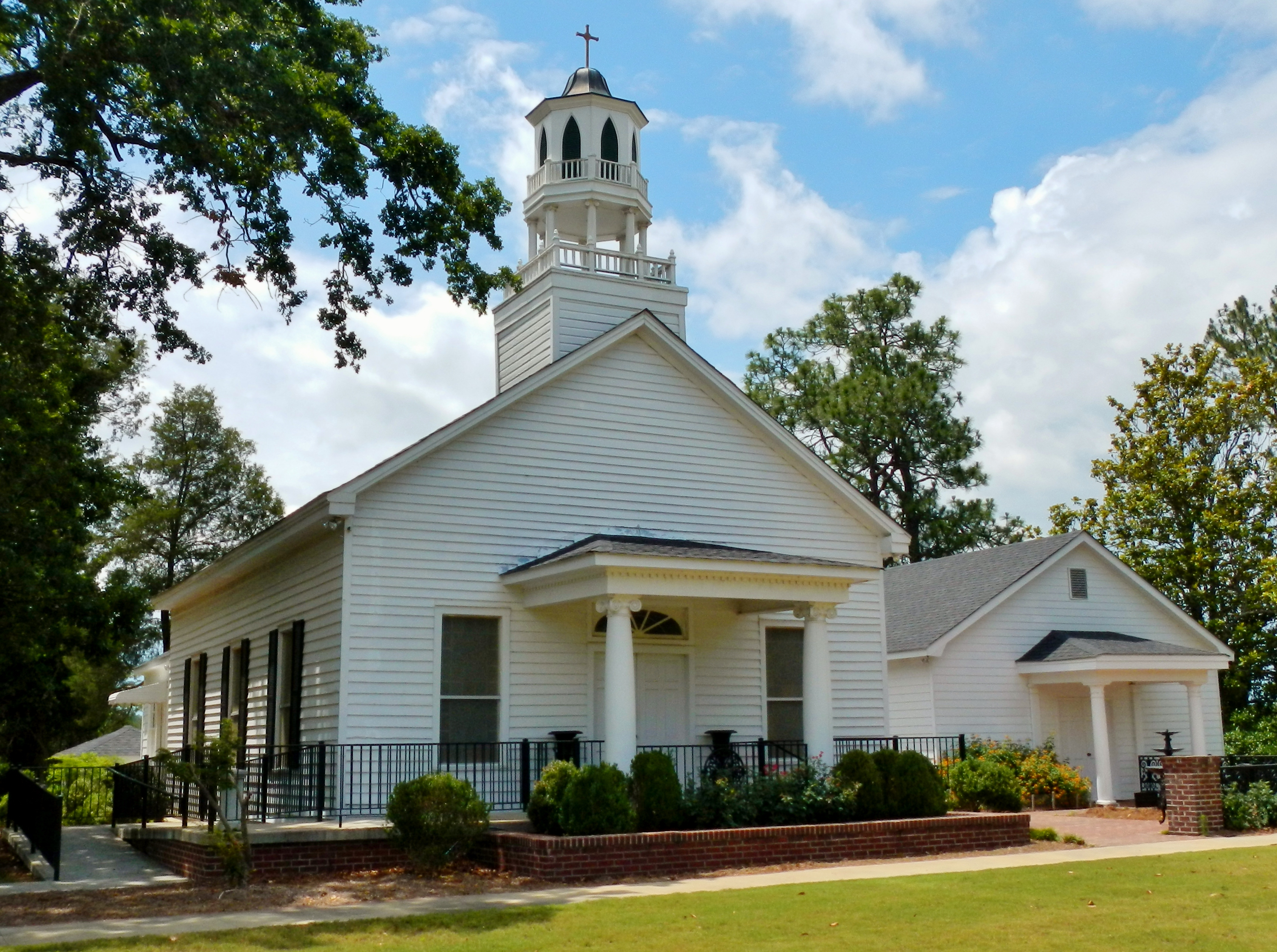
Located just north of Butler, the Union Methodist Church and cemetery were added to the National Register of Historic Places on September 6, 2001.

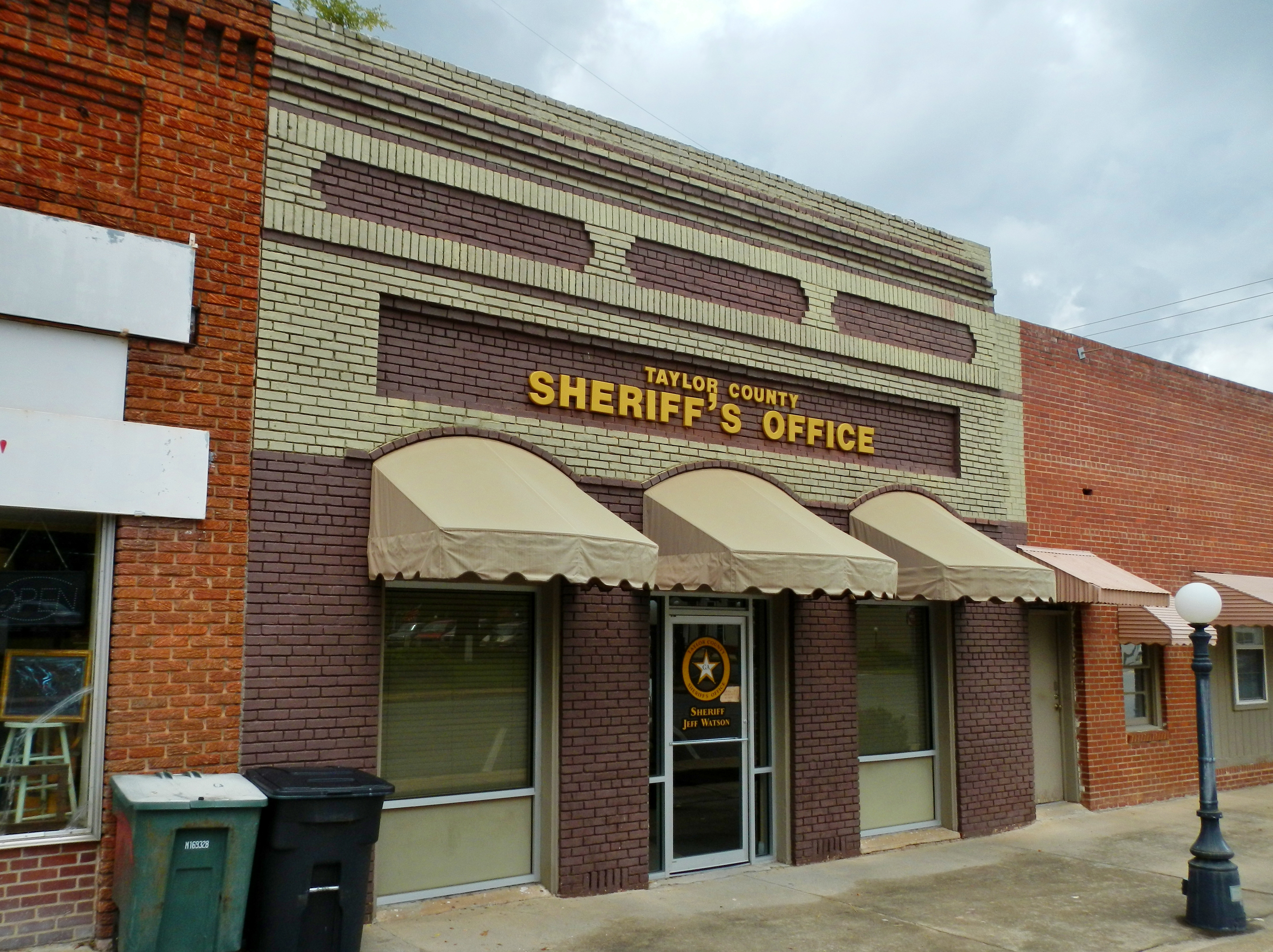
Taylor County Sheriff's Office
