= Attilio (name) =

Attilio (Italian pronunciation: [atˈtiːljo]) is an Italian masculine name. Notable people with that name include:

- Attilio Bertolucci (1911–2000), Italian poet and writer
- Attilio Biseo (1901–1966), Italian aviator
- Attilio Craglietto (1884–1966), Italian educator and politician
- Attilio Deffenu (1890–1918), Italian journalist
- Attilio Demaría (1909–1990), Italian Argentine footballer
- Attilio Fontana (born 1952), Italian politician
- Attilio Fresia (1891–1923), Italian footballer
- Attilio Galassini (1933–2002), Italian footballer
- Attilio Giovannini (1924–2005), Italian footballer
- Attilio Lombardo (born 1966), Italian retired footballer and football manager
- Attilio Marcora (1899–1979), Italian footballer
- Attilio Micheluzzi (1930–1990), Italian comics artist
- Attilio Nicodemo (born 1974), Italian footballer
- Attilio Nicora (1937–2017), Italian Catholic cardinal
- Attilio Piccirilli (1866–1945), American sculptor
- Attilio Pratella (1856–1949), Italian painter
- Attilio Ruffini (1924–2011), Italian politician
- Attilio Salemme (1911–1955), American painter, muralist
- Attilio Sorbi (born 1959), Italian retired footballer and football manager
- Attilio Tesser (born 1958), Italian retired footballer and football manager
- Attilio Trerè (1887–1943), Italian footballer
- Attilio Valobra (1892–1956), Italian footballer
- Attilio Veraldi (1925–1999), Italian writer and translator
- Attilio Viviani (born 1996), Italian cyclist
