= Geppino Micheletti =

Italian doctor (1905-1961)

- Born: July 18, 1905; Trieste, Italy
- Died: December 8, 1961 (aged 56); Narni, Italy
- Occupation: Surgeon

Geppino Micheletti (July 18, 1905 – December 8, 1961) was an Italian doctor active in Pula at the end of the Second World War, and then in Narni.

In 1947 he was awarded the Silver Medal for Civil Valor and the Great Gold Medal of the Municipality of Pula. He is remembered for having operated on the wounded from the Vergarola explosion continuously for over 24 hours on Sunday, August 18, 1946.

The son of Giuseppe Michelstadter and Irma Mejer, who was of Jewish origin, Micheletti was a cousin of the Gorizia philosopher Carlo Michelstaedter. He studied in Turin, qualified in Milan, and specialized in surgery in Bologna. He settled in Pula in the 1920s. During the Second World War, from 1941 to 1943 he was director of the 41st auxiliary surgical group stationed in Croatia, and he was decorated with three War Merit Crosses. In the Vergarolla explosion he lost not only his brother Alberto and his sister-in-law, but also his only two children, Carlo and Renzo, ages 5 and 9, who had gone to the beach like many other children for a traditional swimming competition. Carlo's body was found, but only one shoe remained from Renzo. Despite being informed of their fate, he continued to take care of seriously injured and maimed patients for more than 24 hours at Santorio Santorio Provincial Hospital in Pula.

Following the peace treaty, Geppino Micheletti left Pula with his wife Jolanda in March 1947, after being commended for duty by the Red Cross as indispensable, and having coordinated the evacuation of hospitalized patients. In June 1947 of the same year he found work in Narni, Umbria. He remained there and practiced surgery for 14 years, until his death following a postoperative embolism.

A plaque installed at Rosmini Square (Piazzale Rosmini) in 2008 in Trieste commemorates Micheletti. Next to the memorial stone commemorating the Vergarola explosion at the Pula Cathedral there is also a small memorial stone with his image. The Croatian Post Office paid tribute to Micheletti in 2010 with a commemorative cancellation.
