= June 1946 =

Month of 1946

| << | June 1946 | | | | | >> |
| Su | Mo | Tu | We | Th | Fr | Sa |
| | | | | | | 1 |
| 2 | 3 | 4 | 5 | 6 | 7 | 8 |
| 9 | 10 | 11 | 12 | 13 | 14 | 15 |
| 16 | 17 | 18 | 19 | 20 | 21 | 22 |
| 23 | 24 | 25 | 26 | 27 | 28 | 29 |
| 30 |

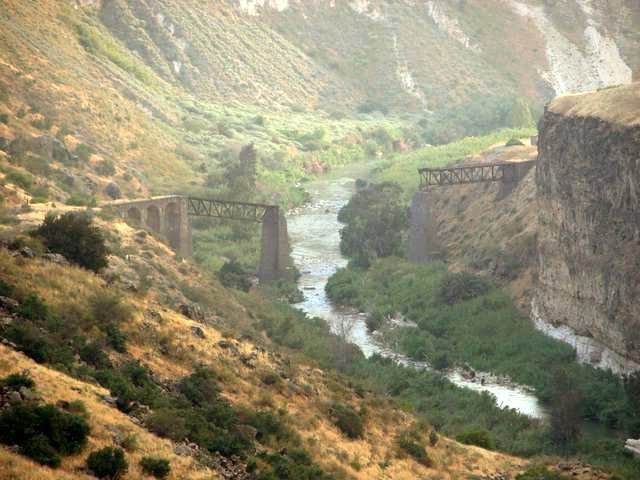
June 16, 1946: Zionist paramilitary destroy eleven bridges in Palestine in one night

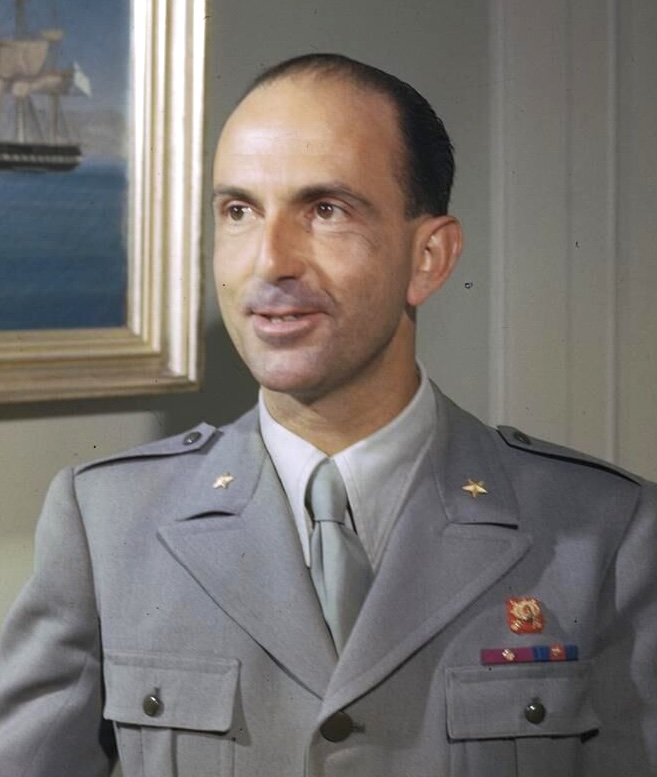
June 13, 1946: Umberto II ends reign as the last King of Italy

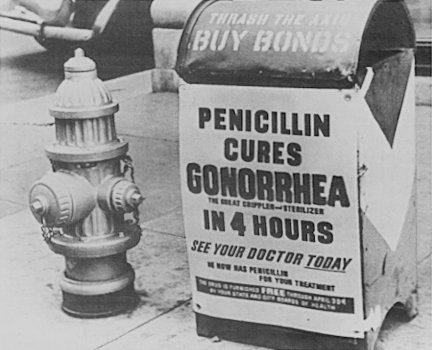
June 1, 1946: Penicillin first marketed in Britain

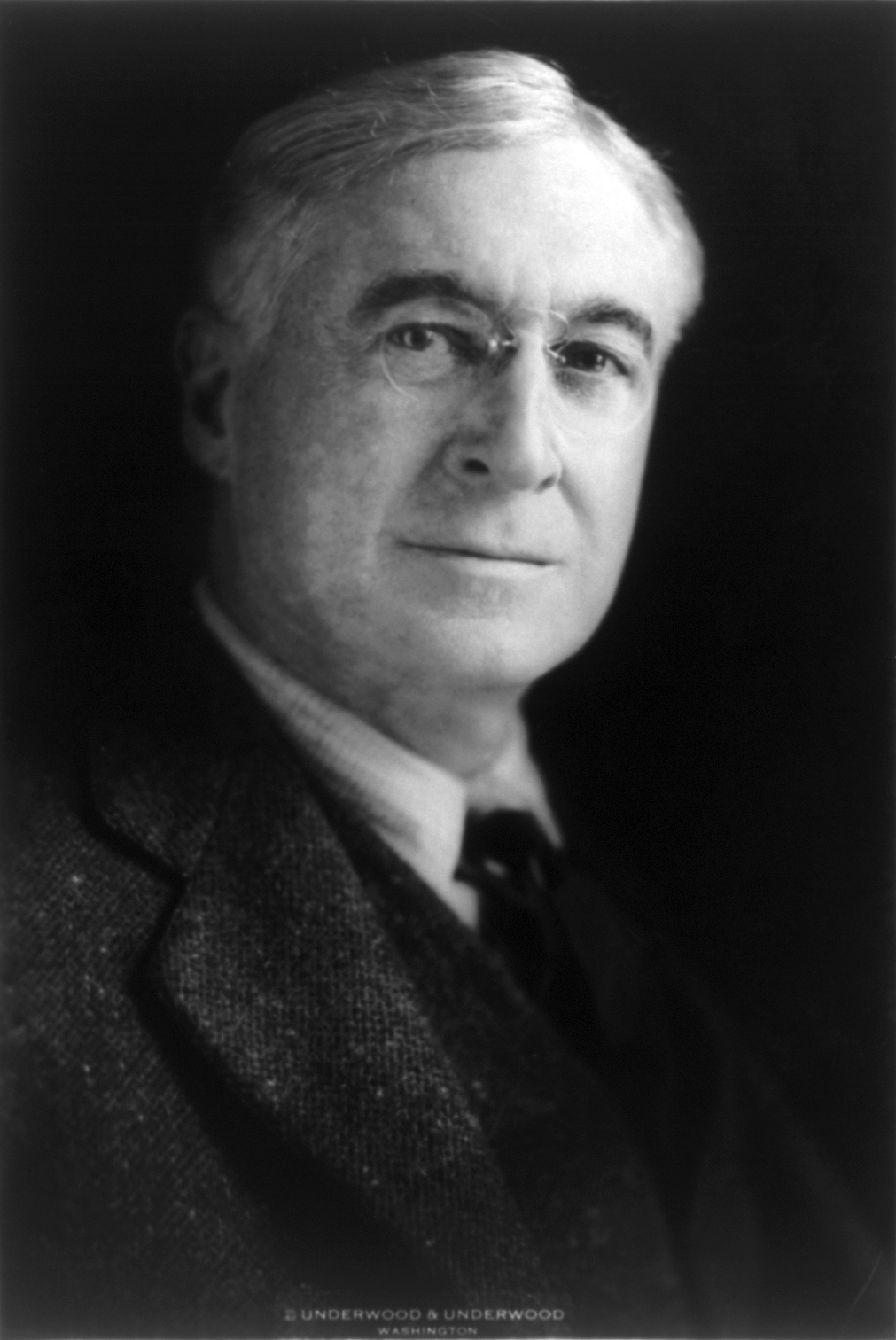
June 14, 1946: Baruch presents "a choice between the quick and the dead"

The following events occurred in June 1946:

== June 1, 1946 (Saturday) ==
- Penicillin first went on sale to the general public in the United Kingdom. The antibiotic had been made available at pharmacies in the United States beginning March 15, 1945.
- Florida Agricultural and Mechanical University's "Marching 100" was founded by the late William P. Foster
- By a 61–20 vote, the U.S. Senate granted President Truman emergency powers to end strikes. The bill had passed the House the previous week.

Cochin-China

- In violation of the Ho–Sainteny agreement of March 6, French High Commissioner d'Argenlieu recognized an "Autonomous Republic of Cochin-China" in French Indochina, predecessor state of South Vietnam. Located in the southern part of what is now Vietnam, with a capital at Saigon, the Republic's first head of government was Nguyen Van Thinh, overseen by French administrator Jean Henri Cedile. The announcement followed the creation, in March, of the Democratic Republic of Viet Nam (later known as North Vietnam) in Hanoi.
- Died:
  - Ion Antonescu, prime minister and "Conducator" (Leader) of Romania during World War II was executed after being found guilty of betraying the Romanian people to German occupiers.
  - Leo Slezak, 72, German opera tenor

== June 2, 1946 (Sunday) ==
- By a vote of 12,718,641 to 10,718,502 in the Italian institutional referendum, the monarchy in Italy was abolished, ending the brief reign of King Umberto II, who would go into exile. The simultaneous general election, the first since the end of World War II and the Fascist Party dictatorship of Benito Mussolini, and also the first in which women were allowed to vote, determined representation for the Constituent Assembly. The Christian Democracy party, led by Prime Minister Alcide De Gasperi, won 207 out of 556 seats and formed a coalition government with the Socialists (115) and Communist (104) parties. The Christian Democracy party would lead the Italian government continuously until 1981.
- In the French Parliamentary election, the French Communist Party (PCF) lost its plurality (from 159 to 153), and the Popular Republican Movement (MRP) gained 16 seats (from 150 to 166). The Socialist Party dropped from 146 to 128. With 586 seats in Parliament, no party had a majority.
- Born: Peter Sutcliffe, English serial killer known as the "Yorkshire Ripper"; in Bingley, West Yorkshire (d. 2020)
- Died: Carrie Ingalls (Caroline Ingalls Swanzey), 75, American newspaper typesetter known from bestselling Little House on the Prairie books written by her older sister, Laura Ingalls Wilder and the subsequent television series.

== June 3, 1946 (Monday) ==
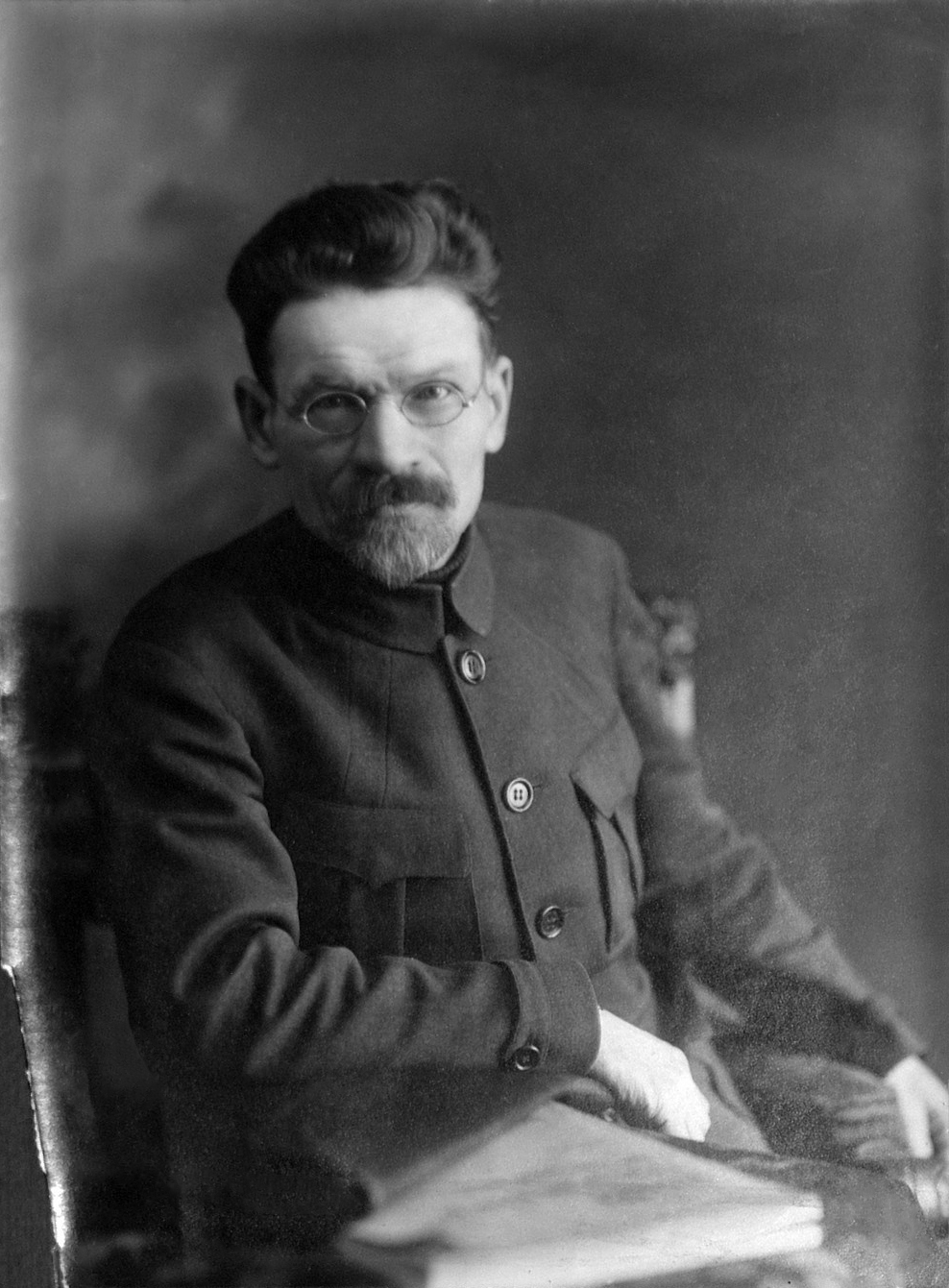
Kalinin

- By a 6–1 vote, the United States Supreme Court ruled in Morgan v. Virginia that a Virginia law, requiring segregation of white and African-American bus passengers, was illegal for interstate travel. The suit had been brought by Irene Morgan, who had refused to sit in the negro section of a bus traveling from Gloucester County, Virginia, to Baltimore, Maryland.
- Died:
  - Mikhail I. Kalinin, 70, former head of state of the U.S.S.R.
  - Ch'en Kung-po, 54, founding member of Chinese Communist Party and collaborator, was executed.

== June 4, 1946 (Tuesday) ==
- The United States Army recovered a treasure trove of jewelry and manuscripts that had been stolen by a group of American officers from the Friedrichshof Castle in Kronberg, Germany. Women's Army Corps Captain Kathleen Nash Durant had hidden part of the loot at her sister's home in Hudson, Wisconsin, and her husband, Colonel Jack W. Durant, had hidden hundreds of diamonds and other gems in a locker at the Illinois Central railway station in Chicago.
- The National School Lunch Act was signed into law by U.S. President Harry S. Truman, permanently establishing federal financial support for free or low-cost meals for schoolchildren.
- The largest solar prominence observed up to that time occurred. The prominence, extending 865,000 miles (1,392,000 km) above the surface of the Sun, was seen from the observatory at Climax, Colorado, by astronomer Walter Orr Roberts. The prominence had been measured at only 300,000 miles (480,000 km) an hour earlier. At its height, the prominence was nearly as long as the Sun's diameter; in a few more hours, it disappeared completely.
- Juan Perón was inaugurated as the twenty-ninth President of Argentina for a six-year elective term.

== June 5, 1946 (Wednesday) ==
- A fire at the La Salle Hotel in Chicago killed 57 people. When the blaze broke out at 12:20 am, there were 1,059 guests and 108 employees in the 20-story building. Firefighters were not called until 15 minutes after the flames were spotted, and by 12:35, the blaze had spread from the hotel's Silver Grill Cocktail Lounge throughout the lower floors. Most of the dead were guests on 3rd, 4th, 5th and 6th floors of the twenty-story building. At least ten people jumped to their deaths.
- Died: George A. Hormel, 85, American multi-millionaire and founder of Hormel Foods

== June 6, 1946 (Thursday) ==
- The Basketball Association of America was formed in New York City. The forerunner of the NBA, the BAA awarded 13 big-city franchises, of which three — the Boston Celtics, the New York Knicks and the Golden State Warriors (in 1946, the Philadelphia Warriors) — still exist. Other teams were in Chicago (Stags), Detroit (Falcons), Pittsburgh (Ironmen), Providence (Steamrollers), St. Louis (Bombers), Toronto (Huskies) and Washington (Capitols), while franchises in Buffalo and Indianapolis failed to play.
- American Research and Development Corporation, the first venture capital firm, was incorporated in Massachusetts by Georges Doriot, Ralph Flanders, Karl Compton and Merrill Griswold.
- U.S. Treasury Secretary Fred M. Vinson was nominated by President Truman to be the new Chief Justice of the United States.
- Died: Gerhart Hauptmann, 83, German dramatist, winner of the 1912 Nobel Prize in Literature

== June 7, 1946 (Friday) ==
- The BBC Television network went back on the air for the first time since it had abruptly halted broadcasting in September 1939.
- After setting a Friday evening deadline for walking out on strike two days earlier, the Pittsburgh Pirates baseball team voted to go ahead with their scheduled game against the New York Giants. On June 5, the players voted unanimously to walk off the job unless they were allowed to join the American Baseball Guild, a labor union. An unidentified player reported that the vote had been 20 to 17 against a walkout. The team went on to beat the Giants 10–5.

== June 8, 1946 (Saturday) ==
- Thirteen months after V-E Day, the United Kingdom celebrated its victory in World War II with a program that featured "all the pomp and circumstance it had given up during the war" and that was witnessed by "nearly one fourth of England's people" Tens of thousands of uniformed marchers represented the Allied nations in a nine-mile-long procession, while the Royal Air Force flew overhead.
- Born: Pearlette Louisy, Governor-General of Saint Lucia from 1997 to 2017; in Laborie

== June 9, 1946 (Sunday) ==
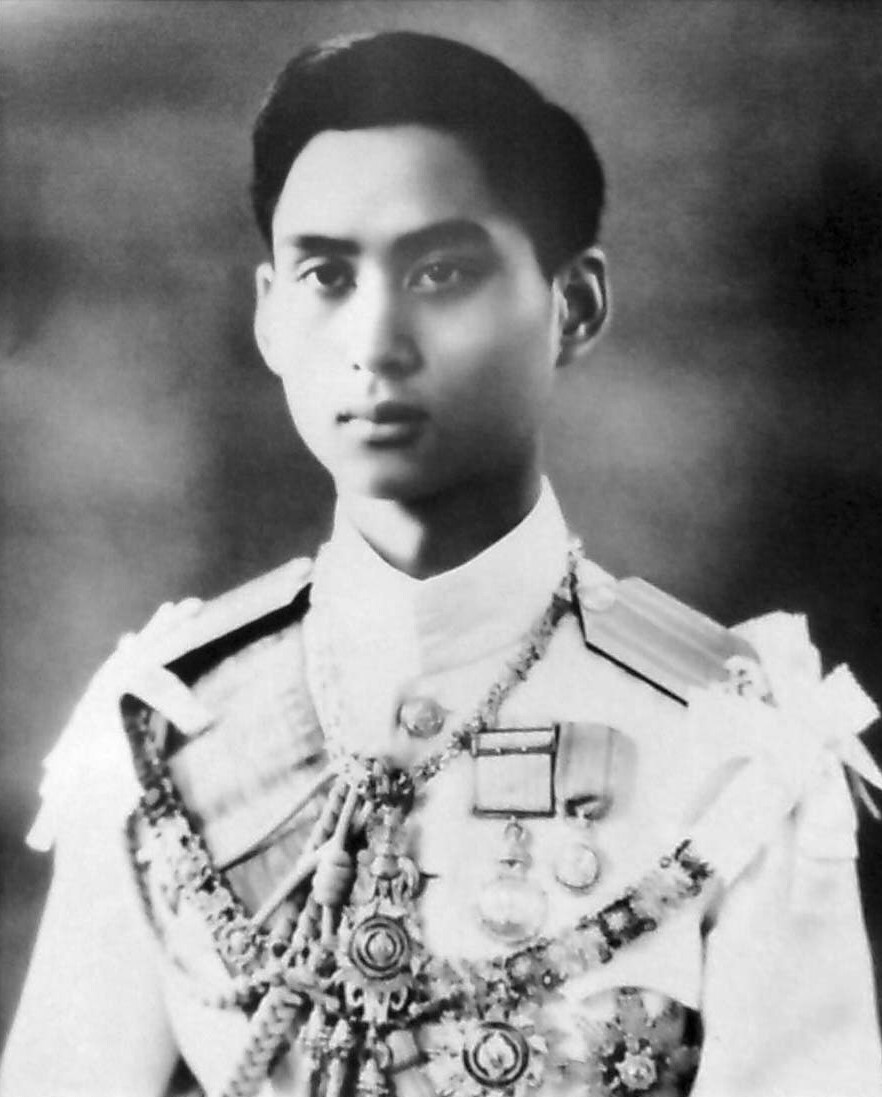
King Ananda Mahidol

- Ananda Mahidol, the 20-year-old King of Thailand, was found in his bedroom dead, from a single gunshot to his forehead, and with his Colt .45 pistol next to him. He was succeeded by his teenaged brother, Bhumibol Adulyadej, who became King Rama IX and ruled until his death in October 2016. Although the death was initially ruled an accidental shooting, and speculated by author Rayne Kruger in The Devil's Discus (Cassell, 1964) to have been a suicide, royal secretary Chaleo Pathumros and two others were executed in 1955 after being convicted of King Ananda's murder.
- A fire at the Canfield Hotel in Dubuque, Iowa, killed 16 people.

== June 10, 1946 (Monday) ==
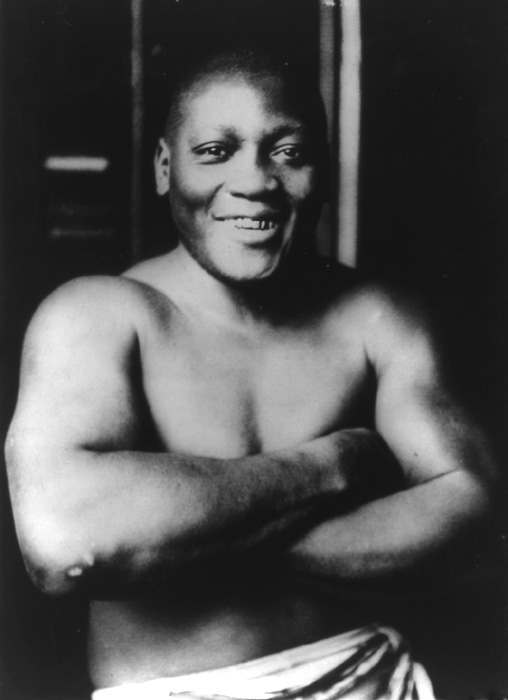
Jack Johnson

- Jack Johnson, 68, the world heavyweight boxing champion from 1908 to 1915, and the first African-American to win that title, was killed in an automobile accident. In 1910, Johnson had defended his title in what was called then "The Fight of the Century", matching him against "The Great White Hope", former champion James J. Jeffries. Johnson had been driving from Texas to New York when his car crashed into a light pole near Franklinton, North Carolina.

== June 11, 1946 (Tuesday) ==
- The Administrative Procedure Act, which governs the rulemaking and judicial functions of all United States government agencies, was signed into law. The law has been described as "the most important statute affecting the administration of justice in the federal field since the passage of the Judiciary Act of 1789".

== June 12, 1946 (Wednesday) ==
- After the Anglo-American Committee of Inquiry had unanimously recommended that up to 100,000 European Jews be allowed to immigrate to Palestine, British Foreign Secretary Ernest Bevin declared that the United Kingdom would reject the plan. Speaking at the annual conference of Britain's Labour Party, Bevin commented that the motive for American support for a Jewish state was "because they did not want too many of them in New York." Following the rejection of the proposal, Zionist leaders began a campaign of violence against the British government in the future state of Israel.
- Died: John H. Bankhead II, 73, U.S. Senator from Alabama since 1931

== June 13, 1946 (Thursday) ==
- After a reign of 31 days, King Umberto II of Italy elected not to further contest the results of the June 2 referendum that abolished the monarchy, and flew into exile. Earlier in the day, Parliament had granted Prime Minister Alcide De Gasperi power to serve as the acting head of state until the election results could be certified.
- Died:
  - Edward Bowes, 72, American creator and host of radio program Major Bowes Amateur Hour
  - Charles Butterworth, 49, American film actor, in an automobile accident
  - Jules Guérin, 79, American mural painter.

== June 14, 1946 (Friday) ==
- As the United States representative to the United Nations Atomic Energy Commission, financier Bernard Baruch spoke at the UNAEC's temporary headquarters at New York's Hunter College, and presented the Baruch Plan, the American proposal for United Nations' control of all nuclear weapons. At the time, the United States was the only nation to have produced an atomic bomb. Baruch opened his remarks by saying, "We are here to make a choice between the quick and the dead.". Under the plan, the U.N.'s member nations would have agreed to not develop nuclear weapons and to allow inspections by the UNAEC to verify compliance, with punishments for violation of the agreement. No member of the U.N. Security Council would have been allowed to veto a resolution for enforcement. In return, the UNAEC would have assisted member nations in developing nuclear energy for peaceful uses. A week later, the Soviet Union made a counterproposal that would have delayed discussion of enforcement procedures until after weapons were destroyed. No agreement was ever reached, and the world's nations developed their own nuclear arsenals. One historian later offered the opinion that "the Baruch Plan was the nearest approach to a world government proposal ever offered by the United States",
- A total lunar eclipse, completely visible over South America, Europe, Africa, Asia, Australia, was seen rising over South America, Europe and Africa and setting over Asia and Australia took place.

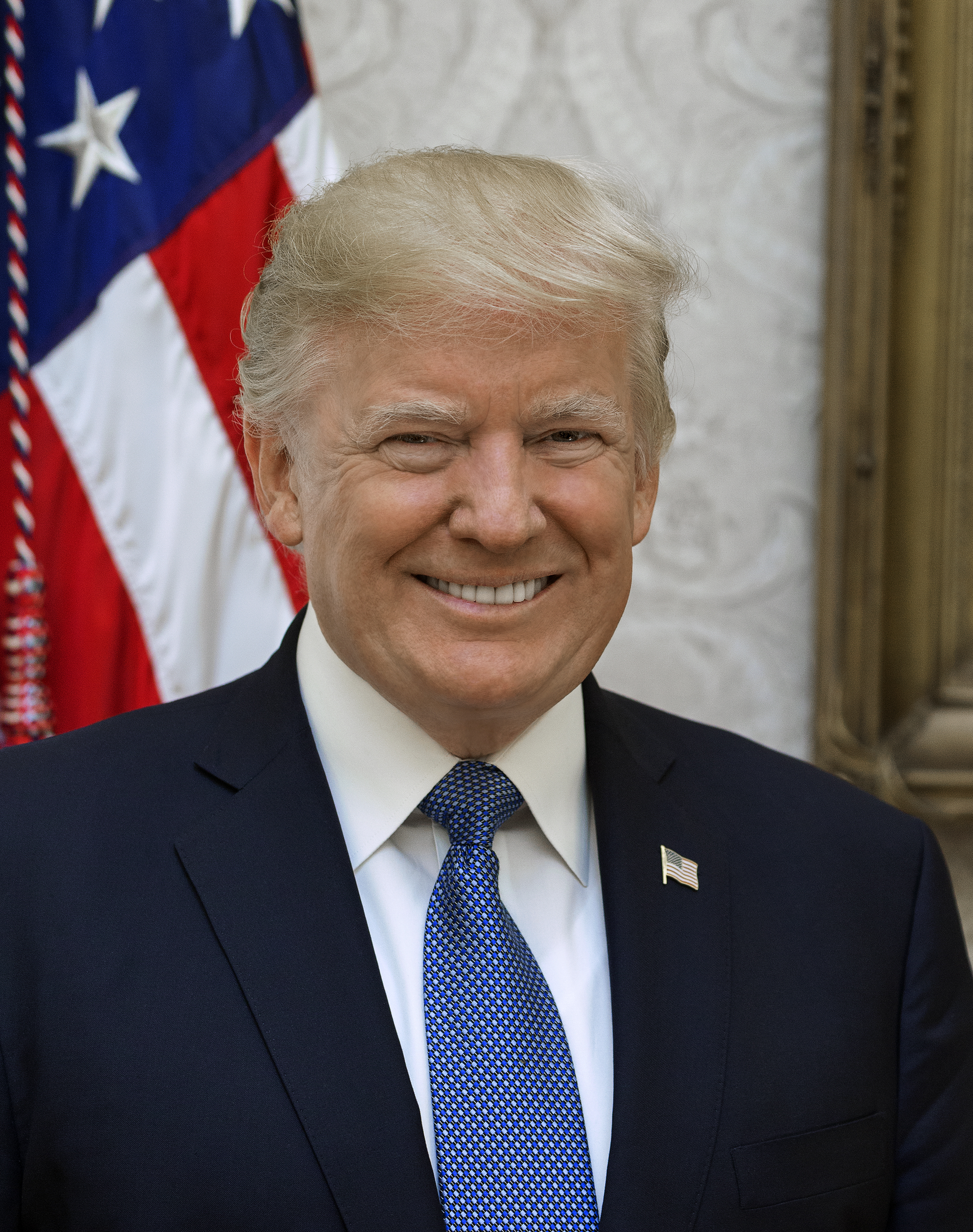
President Trump

- Born: Donald Trump, President of the United States 2017 to 2021 and 2025–Present, U.S. businessman and television personality; in New York City
- Died:
  - John Logie Baird, 57, Scottish inventor of television technology
  - Jorge Ubico, 67, Guatemalan dictator

== June 15, 1946 (Saturday) ==
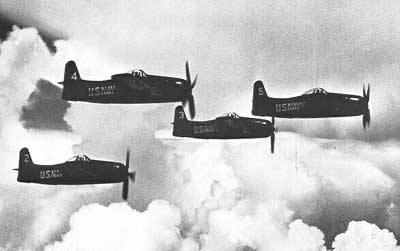
The original Blue Angels

- The Blue Angels, the aerial demonstration team for the U.S. Navy and the U.S. Marine Corps, made its very first performance, with four pilots under the leadership of Lt. Commander Butch Voris flying at an airshow at the Jacksonville Naval Air Station in Florida.
- In golf's U.S. Open, Byron Nelson, Lloyd Mangrum and Vic Ghezzi finished 72 holes of golf in a three-way tie, each having 283, at the tournament in Cleveland. Nelson would have won outright, but his caddy had accidentally brushed his foot against the ball when Nelson's fans crowded the area, costing a penalty stroke. The next day, the three men tied again at 72 in an 18-hole playoff. In the second playoff, played during a violent thunderstorm, Mangrum — who had been wounded twice during the Battle of the Bulge finished at 72, a stroke ahead of Nelson and Ghezzi.
- Born: Demis Roussos, Greek singer; in Alexandria, Egypt (d. 2015)

== June 16, 1946 (Sunday) ==
- The "Night of the Bridges" took place as agents of the Palmach, a strike force of the Zionist group Haganah, destroyed eleven highway and railway bridges on the night of June 16–17. Author Joseph Heller commented later "Ten bridges connecting Palestine with the neighboring states were destroyed with no casualties. British occupying forces rounded many of the Haganah members in Operation Agatha days later.

== June 17, 1946 (Monday) ==
- Jordan achieved independence when the Treaty of London officially came into effect.
- Mobile Telephone Service (MTS), the first "car phone" service in the United States, was introduced by AT&T in St. Louis, Missouri, working in conjunction with Southwestern Bell. With the aid of a radio tower that transmitted on 120 kHz and could handle only one call at a time, customers could place and receive phone calls in their automobiles. The service was then instituted in other American cities. To call someone on an MTS phone, a person would first call an AT&T operator, who would then send a signal to the designated MTS telephone number. Calls from an auto were also operator assisted.
- A tornado swept through Detroit and then across the U.S.-Canada border into Windsor, Ontario, killing 17 people.
- Born: Marcy Kaptur, U.S. Representative (D-Ohio) since 1983; in Toledo, Ohio

== June 18, 1946 (Tuesday) ==
- In Goa, at that time part of the colony of Portuguese India, Dr. Ram Manohar Lohia began the passive resistance movement against the Portuguese administration to become part of an independent India. The resistance continued for 15 years until Goa and other Portuguese colonies were invaded by the Indian army and annexed. Goa became India's 25th state in 1987.
- Born:
  - Russell Ash, British children's author known for The Top 10 of Everything and its sequels; in Surrey (d. 2010)
  - Bruiser Brody (ring name for as Frank Goodish), American professional wrestler; in Detroit (d. 1988)

== June 19, 1946 (Wednesday) ==
- Georges Bidault was elected as the Provisional President of France by the National Assembly, with 389 votes out of the 586 possible. Communist legislators refused to participate in the vote.
- A rematch between world heavyweight boxing champion Joe Louis and challenger Billy Conn attracted 45,266 fight fans to Yankee Stadium, while another 140,000 viewed the fight on the NBC television network (including broadcasts in theatres). The first boxing match broadcast on television. After a lacklustre fight, Louis knocked Conn out in the eighth round.;
- Andrei Gromyko, the Soviet Union's representative to the United Nations submitted a response to the Baruch Plan proposed by the United States six days earlier, with a disarmament plan of his own. The Soviet proposal was that the world's nations ratify a treaty pledging not to build nuclear weapons, and that within 90 days after ratification, the United States would destroy its atomic weapons arsenal.
- Sixty-three Germans and twenty Ukrainian refugees were killed in the explosion of ammunition that had been stored by the Nazi German regime in a salt mine at Hänigsen, near Celle.

== June 20, 1946 (Thursday) ==
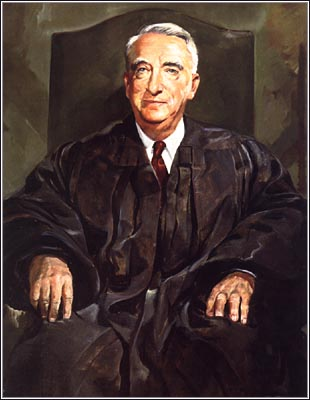
Chief Justice Vinson

- An agreement to withdraw all Allied occupation forces from Italy, over a 90-day period, was approved in Paris by the representatives of the "Big Four" powers (France, the Soviet Union, the United States and the United Kingdom). The Soviets also agreed to withdraw their troops from Bulgaria.
- Fred M. Vinson was confirmed as the new Chief Justice of the United States Supreme Court by unanimous vote of the U.S. Senate. Vinson, the U.S. Secretary of the Treasury, was sworn in four days later.
- The drama film Anna and the King of Siam starring Irene Dunne and Rex Harrison was released.
- Born: Xanana Gusmão, first President of East Timor (2002–2007), Prime Minister 2007 to 2015; in Manatuto, Portuguese Timor
- Died: Wanrong, 39, the last Empress Consort of China following her marriage to Emperor Puyi

== June 21, 1946 (Friday) ==
- At the Nuremberg trials, Albert Speer, who had been the German Minister of Armaments and War Production, testified before the War Crimes Tribunal that the Nazis had been "a year or two away from splitting the atom" before the end of World War II. Speer said that Germany's development of a nuclear bomb had been delayed because many of its atomic scientists had fled to the United States to escape Adolf Hitler's regime.
- A cloud of ammonia killed seven people and injured 41 at the Baker Hotel in Dallas. Most of the victims were hotel employees who were overcome when an air conditioning unit, in the hotel's basement, exploded.

== June 22, 1946 (Saturday) ==
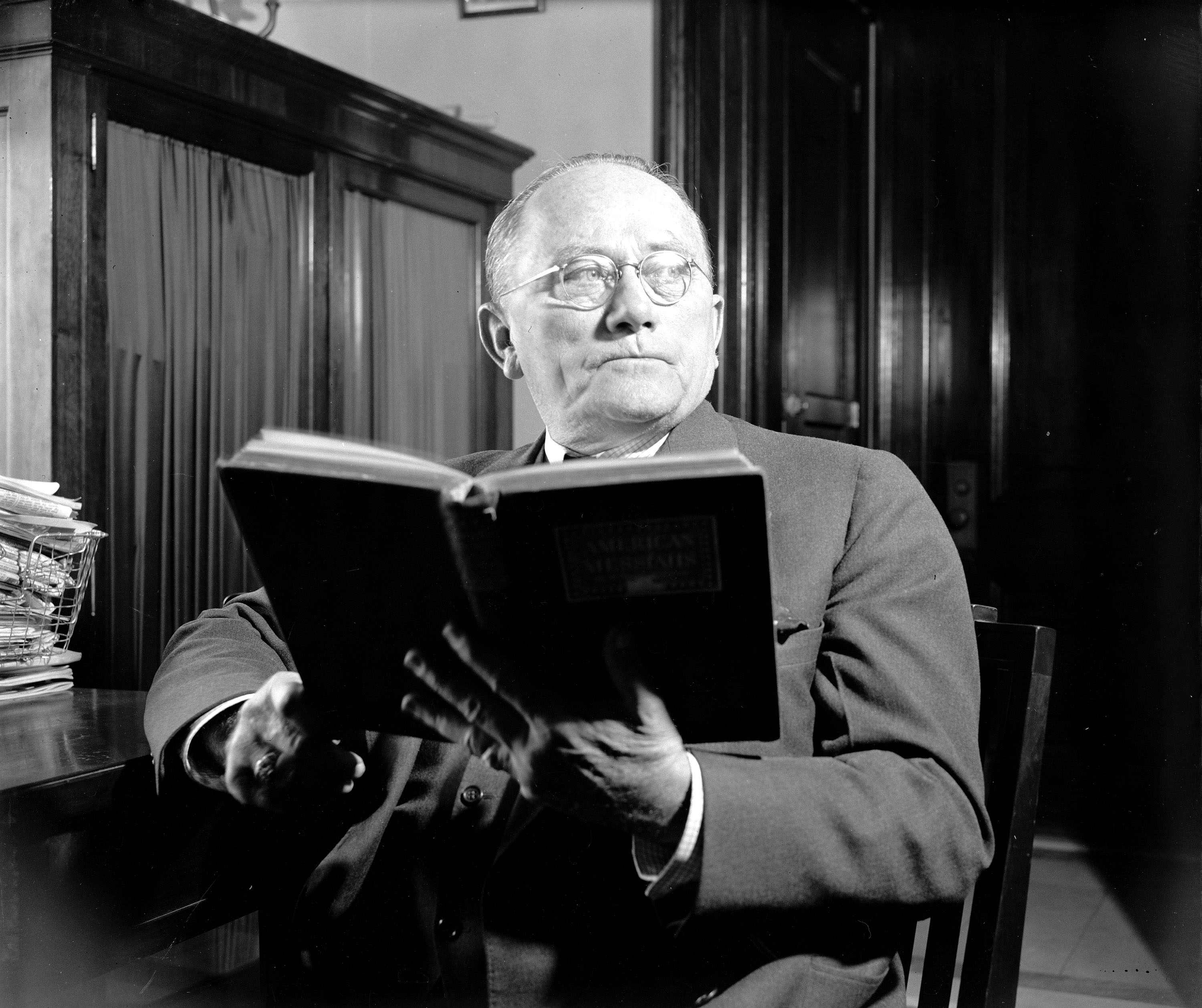
Senator Bilbo

- U.S. Senator Theodore G. Bilbo of Mississippi, running for re-election in the Democratic primary, said in a radio broadcast that he was calling on every "red-blooded Anglo-Saxon man in Mississippi to resort to any means to keep hundreds of Negroes from the polls in the July 2 primary", then added, "And if you don't know what the means, you are just not up on your persuasive measures." Bilbo won re-election in the primary and general election, but as a result of his call for violence against African-American voters, the United States Senate refused to let him be sworn in for a new term.
- The first delivery of the United States mail by jet plane was made by two P-80 Shooting Star planes. The inaugural flight left Schenectady, New York, at 12:18, and arrived in Washington, D.C., at 1:07 pm, with an air mail letter delivered to President Truman.
- Born: Kay Redfield Jamison, American psychiatrist and bipolar disorder specialist

== June 23, 1946 (Sunday) ==
- The Monnet Plan, France's proposal to dismantle 200 factories in the French Zone of Occupation in southeast Germany to offset France's war losses of 4,869,000,000,000 francs (40 billion dollars) was presented. Over the next three years, the machinery from 22 factories in the occupation zone would be moved to France, and another 88 factories would be destroyed.
- The National Democratic Front won a landslide victory in the municipal elections in French India
- Born: Ted Shackelford, American television actor known for Knots Landing from 1979 to 1993; in Oklahoma City
- Died: William S. Hart, 81, American film actor and star of Westerns during silent era

== June 24, 1946 (Monday) ==
- Seven players on the Spokane Indians minor league baseball team, and their manager, were killed when their bus veered through a guard rail on the Snoqualmie Pass Highway and plunged down a 500-foot (150 m) embankment and into a ravine. The Indians, in fifth place in the Western International League (now the Northwest League) had been on their way to Bremerton, Washington, for a seven-game series against the Bluejackets.
- Born:
  - Ellison Onizuka, American astronaut; in Kealakekua, Hawaii (killed in the Challenger disaster 1986)
  - Robert Reich, U.S. Secretary of Labor 1993 to 1997; in Scranton, Pennsylvania

== June 25, 1946 (Tuesday) ==
- The World Bank (officially the International Bank for Reconstruction and Development) began operations, with Eugene Meyer, former chairman of the U.S. Federal Reserve Board, as the IBRD's first president.
- Ten middle school students were killed and twenty wounded at Xuzhou (Hsuchow), in China's Jiangsu province, after Nationalist Army officer Feng Yu-xiang Fang Jingxing ordered them to be fired on by machine guns. The massacre followed an angry confrontation between the students and the officer.

== June 26, 1946 (Wednesday) ==
- Taking the Chinese Civil War into a new phase, President Chiang Kai-shek launched a nationwide military campaign against the Communist Chinese forces of Mao Zedong, with Chiang's Nationalist Army moving into central China to take back rural areas that were under Communist control. The Nationalists had superior weapons and more troops, and Chiang received American aid for a strategy that he hoped would defeat Mao's forces within six months. Within nine months, it was clear that the campaign was failing, and by the end of 1949, China's mainland was under control of the Communist forces.
- On the day the campaign started, Nationalist Chinese pilot Liu Shanben defected to the Communists and delivered a B-24 Liberator bomber to the opposition, starting a wave of similar acts. Within three years, 54 pilots and 20 airplanes joined the Communist side.
- William Heirens, a 17-year-old student at the University of Chicago, was arrested for burglary, and soon charged with three murders tied to "The Lipstick Killer", including the January 7 murder of 6-year old Suzanne Degnan.
- Died: Alexander Duncan McRae, 71, Canadian multimillionaire

== June 27, 1946 (Thursday) ==
- All 46 people aboard the Spanish submarine C-4 were killed after the sub collided with the Spanish destroyer Lepanto during a naval exercise off of the Balearic Islands.
- The Canadian Citizenship Act was approved by Canada's House of Commons, separating Canadian citizenship from British nationality, effective January 1, 1947; Canada was the first Commonwealth country to create its own citizenship laws.
- Born: Sally Priesand, first woman rabbi in the United States; in Cleveland.
- Died: Juan Antonio Ríos, 57, President of Chile since 1942; of cancer

== June 28, 1946 (Friday) ==
- The first recorded birth in Japan of a baby born of a Japanese mother and one of the American soldiers occupying Japan, was announced on Japanese radio. The birth, the first of tens of thousands that would follow, came a little more than nine months after the first American occupation forces had arrived on the Honshu island.
- Born: Gilda Radner, American comedian and actress; in Detroit (d. 1989)
- Died: Antoinette Perry, 58, American stage actress for whom the Tony Awards are named

== June 29, 1946 (Saturday) ==
- In Palestine, the British Army oversaw "Operation Agatha", the arrest of 2,700 suspected Jewish terrorists in retaliation of the destruction of 11 bridges two weeks earlier, detaining them at a prison camp at Latrun. The Haganah escalated terror attacks in response, with the King David Hotel bombing taking place the following month.
- Born: Egon von Fürstenberg, Swiss fashion designer who created "the power look"; in Lausanne (d. 2004)

== June 30, 1946 (Sunday) ==
- After nearly five years of price and wage controls by the United States Office of Price Administration, the OPA's emergency wartime powers ended at midnight. Two days earlier, the U.S. Senate declined to extend the OPA's authority, and a final appeal to the American public by President Truman failed. Expiring at midnight also were the mandates of the Fair Employment Practice Committee (FEPC), which had acted against discrimination by race, and the War Relocation Authority, which carried out racial discrimination, most notably in the internment of more than 100,000 Japanese Americans during World War II, was abolished.
- In a national referendum, voters in Poland were presented with a yes-or-no choice on three issues: abolishing the Senate; supporting nationalization of industries and land, and conforming the border with the Soviet Union to reflect the loss of lands east of the Odra and Nysa rivers. Official results showed two-thirds approval of all three measures, placed Poland under Communist rule for the next 43 years, by the Polish Workers' Party.
