= Valobra =

Valobra is an Italian surname. Notable people with the surname include:

- Attilio Valobra (1892–1956), Italian footballer
- Ferruccio Valobra (1898–1944), Italian partisan
- Lelio Vittorio Valobra (1900–1976), Italian lawyer
