= August 1946 =

Month of 1946

<<	August 1946					>>
Su	Mo	Tu	We	Th	Fr	Sa
				1	2	3
4	5	6	7	8	9	10
11	12	13	14	15	16	17
18	19	20	21	22	23	24
25	26	27	28	29	30	31

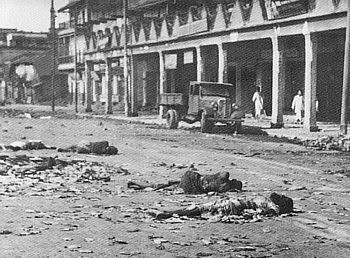
August 16, 1946: Direct Action Day protest turns into rioting in Calcutta and 10,000 people die

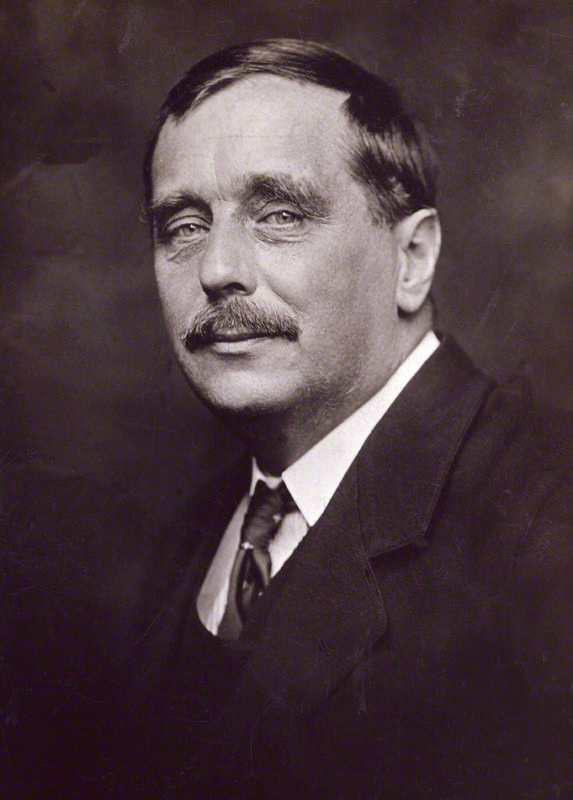
August 13, 1946: H. G. Wells dies at age 79

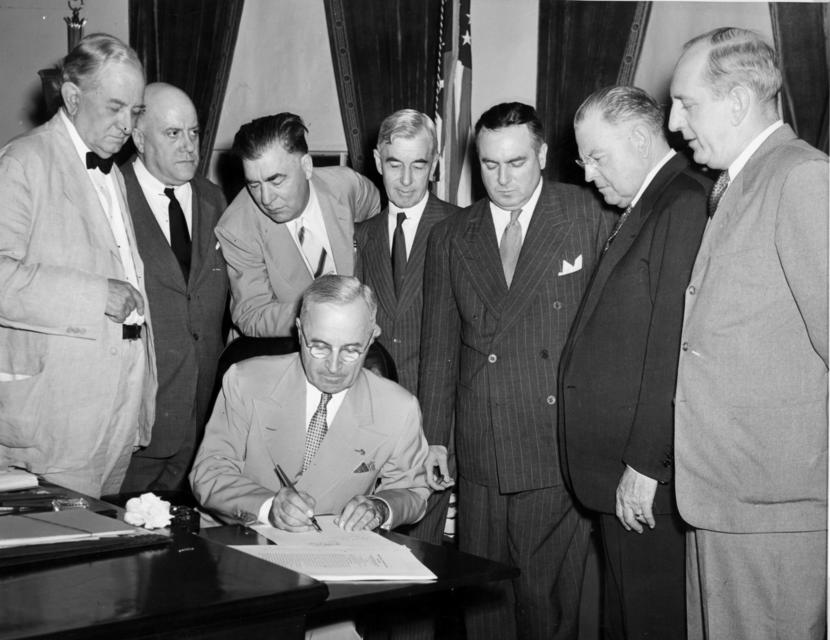
August 1, 1946: U.S. President Truman signs Atomic Energy Act of 1946

The following events occurred in August 1946:

== August 1, 1946 (Thursday) ==
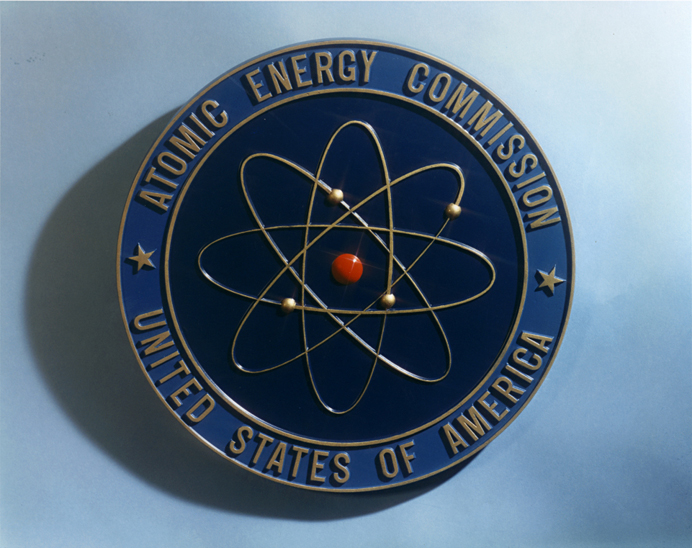

- The five-member Atomic Energy Commission was established, transferring control of nuclear weapons from military to civilian control.
- The Fulbright Scholarship program was created.
- Scandinavian Airlines (SAS) was founded as a consortium of the flag carriers of Denmark, Norway and Sweden.
- Born:
  - Mike Emrick, American sportscaster on The NHL on NBC); in La Fontaine, Indiana
  - Sandi Griffiths, American singer on The Lawrence Welk Show; in Los Angeles

== August 2, 1946 (Friday) ==
- The first sale of radioactive isotopes was completed, when a container of carbon-14 was delivered from the Oak Ridge National Laboratory to the Barnard Free Skin and Cancer Hospital in St. Louis.
- What would become known as the "Battle of Athens" took place in Athens, Tennessee, a group of World War II veterans took up arms to keep the McMinn County sheriff and his deputies from counting the ballots in the primary election.
- Born: Nakagami Kenji, Japanese novelist; in Shingū, Wakayama prefecture (d. 1992)
- Died: Red Army General Andrey Vlasov, 45, was executed in the Soviet Union after being convicted of treason for fighting on the side of Nazi Germany since 1942.

== August 3, 1946 (Saturday) ==
- Santa Claus Land, credited as the first "theme park" for coordinating amusement park rides with a Christmas time theme, was opened by Louis Koch at Santa Claus, Indiana. Now operating as Holiday World, the park preceded Disneyland by nine years.
- Born: Jack Straw, British Home Secretary 1997–2001, Foreign Secretary 2001–06; in Buckhurst Hill, Essex

== August 4, 1946 (Sunday) ==
- An 8.0 magnitude earthquake killed more than 100 people in the Dominican Republic. Almost of the victims were killed by a tsunami that washed over the coastal village of Matanza after the shock registered at 1:51 pm local time (1751 UTC).

== August 5, 1946 (Monday) ==
- Neil Armstrong of Wapakoneta, Ohio, who on July 20, 1969, would be the first man to walk on the Moon, earned his student pilot's certificate on his 16th birthday, learning on an Aeronca Champion airplane.
- Born: Shirley Ann Jackson, Chair of the Nuclear Regulatory Commission, and the first African-American woman to earn a Ph.D. in physics; in Washington, D.C.

== August 6, 1946 (Tuesday) ==
- Hungary's gold reserve of $32,000,000 was returned to Budapest, from Frankfurt, where it had been stored by the government of Nazi Germany. The return of the gold stabilized the Hungarian economy following the hyperinflation of the prior two months.
- Martin Luther King Jr., a 17-year-old junior at Morehouse College, began a lifelong crusade against racial prejudice, with the publication of a letter in the Atlanta Constitution, in response to an editorial. His father later remarked that the letter was the first "indication that Martin was headed for greatness".
- A pair of unmanned B-17 bombers landed in California after having been flown a distance of 2,174 miles from Hawaii, piloted entirely by radio control, as the United States Army carried out "Operation Remote". Press releases declared that the experiment proved "that guided missiles of the air forces can be launched by radio control and successfully hit a target more than 2,000 miles distant".
- Died: Tony Lazzeri, 42, American MLB 2nd baseman enshrined in the Baseball Hall of Fame

== August 7, 1946 (Wednesday) ==
- The Dardanelles crisis began when Soviet leader Joseph Stalin sent a demand to Turkey to permit "joint defense" of the Dardanelles Strait, with the implication that Soviet troops would enter Turkish territory. At the same time, editorials appeared in the Soviet press supporting the retrocession of the Kars Province, Ardahan and Artvin, which had been ceded from Russia to Turkey after World War One. Concluding that a takeover of Turkey would allow the Soviets to control the Middle East, U.S. President Truman sent the USS Franklin D. Roosevelt and two destroyers to the area.
- Mariano Ospina Pérez was inaugurated as the 23rd President of Colombia.

== August 8, 1946 (Thursday) ==
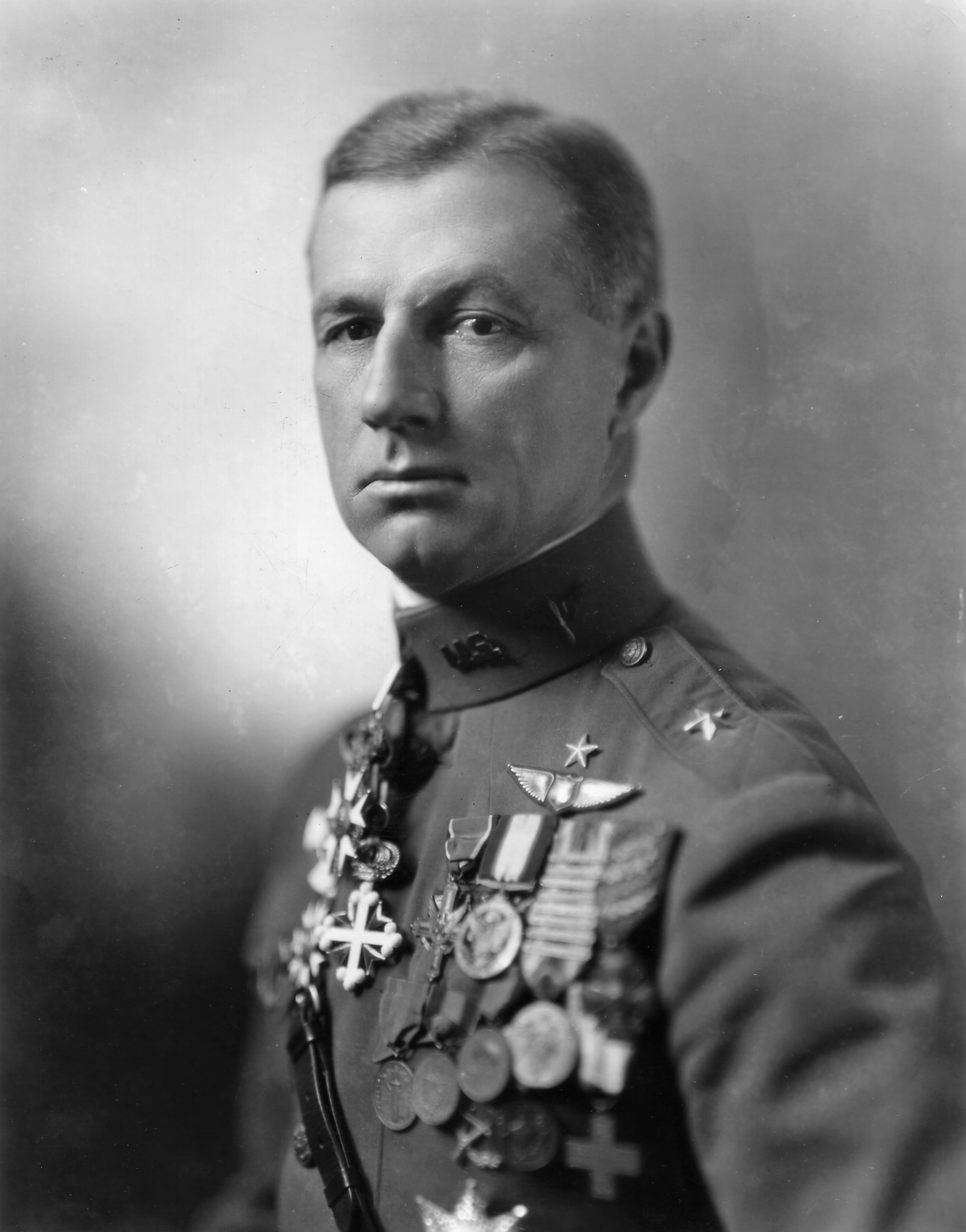
Mitchell

- The B-36 Peacemaker bomber was flown by the United States Air Force for the first time. Designed to carry the atomic bomb, and having a range of 6,000 miles, the B-36 was the first intercontinental carrier of nuclear weapons.
- More than twenty years after his court-martial and resignation from the United States Army, and ten years after his death, Billy Mitchell was awarded the Medal of Honor by the U.S. Congress "for outstanding pioneer service in the field of American military aviation", and posthumously promoted to the rank of Major General.

== August 9, 1946 (Friday) ==
- The body of African-American veteran John Cecil Jones, victim of a lynching, was found in a bayou near Minden, Louisiana. As a result of an investigation by the NAACP, the crime was reported nationwide and led to the first FBI investigation of a lynching in Louisiana, followed by the creation of a Committee on Civil Rights by President Truman. One author described the response to the Jones murder as "the first time since Reconstruction that the federal government had evinced any real concern over the discriminatiory treatment of black people".
- Born: :
  - Alain Dorval, French voice actor known for dubbing the voice of Sylvester Stallone in French language presentations of English language films; in Algiers, French Algeria (d. 2024)
  - Jim Kiick, American NFL running back, in Lincoln Park, New Jersey (d. 2020)

== August 10, 1946 (Saturday) ==
- In Athens, Alabama, a mob of white men and teenagers, estimated at 2,000 people, rioted after two white men had been jailed for an unprovoked attack on a black man the day before. Breaking into smaller groups, the mob went into town and began beating any African-American seen in the street. State troops, sent by the Governor, arrived at 4:00 pm and restored order by midnight. Nobody was killed, but more than 50 black persons were injured. Sixteen white suspects were later indicted by a county grand jury for the violence.

== August 11, 1946 (Sunday) ==
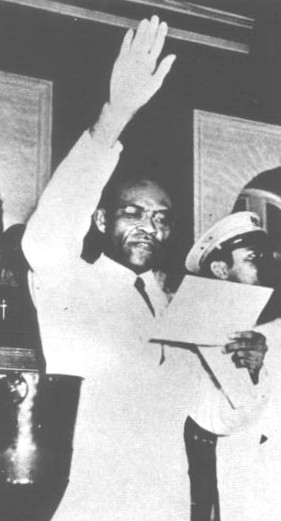
Dumarsais Estimé

- Schoolteacher Dumarsais Estimé was elected President of Haiti

== August 12, 1946 (Monday) ==
- In the largest labor strike in South Africa since 1922, more than 60,000 black members of the African Mineworkers Union walked away from their jobs in the nation's gold mines, including 13,000 at Witwatersrand. A group of 4,000 striking miners marched at Johannesburg to protest working conditions.

== August 13, 1946 (Tuesday) ==
- Tenth Circuit Judge Joseph McCarthy defeated longtime U.S. Senator Robert M. La Follette Jr. in the Wisconsin Republican primary.
- In the United States, the Indian Claims Commission was established to fix a fair market value for land taken from the American Indians "at the time the land was taken". An example of the low awards of compensation was $29.1 million for the entire state of California, at 47 cents an acre. Between 1946 and the 1951 deadline, 370 petitions were filed.
- Died:
  - H. G. Wells, 79, British science fiction author who wrote The Time Machine in 1895
  - William J. Gallagher, 71, retired Minneapolis street sweeper who was elected to Congress in 1944.

== August 14, 1946 (Wednesday) ==
- Soviet politician Andrei Zhdanov began a campaign against writers and artists whose work showed "anti-Soviet sentiment" or complacency toward Communist party goals. At Zhdanov's direction, the Central Committee of the Soviet Communist Party passed the resolution "About the journals Zvezda and Leningrad" on proper Soviet literature, condemning the two literary magazines for publishing the works of author Mikhail Zoshchenko and poet Anna Akhmatova. The editors of the magazines were replaced, and the two writers were barred from publishing further works. Similar condemnations followed against bourgeois influence in theater (August 26) and film productions (September 4).
- An American B-29 reconnaissance plane discovered a large ice floe 300 miles north of Alaska. Nine miles in width, 17 miles long, and ideal for the basing of aircraft, "Target X" was the first of three "floating bases" used by the United States.
- Born: Larry Graham, Bassist for the band Sly and the Family Stone; in Beaumont, Texas

== August 15, 1946 (Thursday) ==
- The "Truman Doctrine" was announced by U.S. President Harry S. Truman, who told Turkey's President İsmet İnönü that the United States would provide its assistance to help Turkey resist Soviet demands for control of the Dardanelles straits. Over the next year, Truman lobbied Congress to provide more than $400,000,000 in aid to both Turkey and Greece as part of American strategy in the Middle East.
- The Alfred Hitchcock-directed thriller film Notorious starring Cary Grant, Ingrid Bergman and Claude Rains premiered in New York City.
- Died: Edward R. Bradley, 86, horse breeding magnate

== August 16, 1946 (Friday) ==
- "Direct Action Day", which was intended as a peaceful protest in favor of creating a separate Muslim nation of "Pakistan", rather than having a Hindu-majority government in an independent British India, turned into rioting that killed more than 10,000 people in and around Calcutta. Muslim League leader Muhammad Ali Jinnah had set a day "for the Muslim Nation to resort to direct action to achieve Pakistan and assert their just rights to vindicate their honor" after the League decided not to participate in a government with the Hindu Indian National Congress led by Mahatma Gandhi. Historians disagree as to which side began the killing, but before the violence was put down, 3,000 Hindus and 7,000 Muslims had been murdered in religious violence.
- The founding conference of the All Hyderabad Trade Union Congress is convened in Secunderabad, Hyderabad State.
- The Kurdistan Democratic Party was founded in Iraq by Mustafa Barzani.
- Born: Jim Brochu, American stage actor and playwright; in Brooklyn

== August 17, 1946 (Saturday) ==
- Robert Penn Warren's novel All the King's Men was published for the first time, by Harcourt Press.
- Soviet physicist Pyotr L. Kapitsa was removed from his posts and put under house arrest after offending Lavrentiy Beria. Kapitsa, who would be awarded the Nobel Prize in Physics in 1978, was reportedly spared from execution by order of Joseph Stalin, and lived until 1984.
- First Sergeant Lawrence Lambert of the U.S. Army Air Forces became the first person in United States to test an ejection seat.
- "To Each His Own" by Eddy Howard hit #1 on the Billboard Honor Roll of Hits.

== August 18, 1946 (Sunday) ==
- The All-America Football Conference (AAFC), which would later bring the San Francisco 49ers and the Cleveland Browns to the NFL, made its debut with an exhibition game in Portland, Oregon. The Brooklyn Dodgers and the Chicago Rockets played to a 14–14 tie. The first regular season AAFC game would take place on September 6.
- The explosion of a pile of sea mines killed 70 people on a beach at the seaside resort of Pula, which had formerly been under the control of Italy and was in Yugoslavia after World War II.

== August 19, 1946 (Monday) ==
- An American C-47 transport plane was shot down after straying into the airspace of Yugoslavia, a week after another group of American flyers had been captured. All five men aboard the plane were killed in the crash.
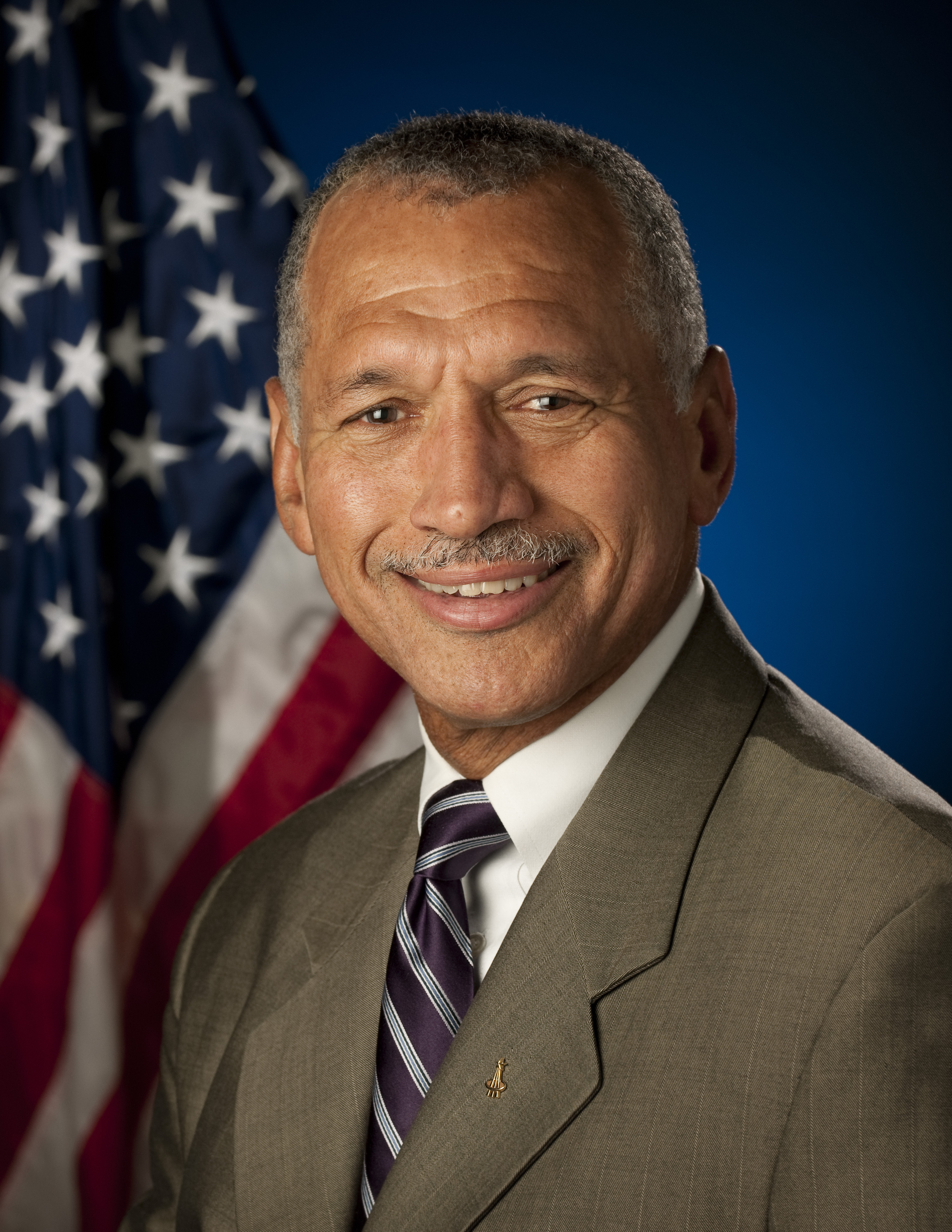
President Clinton, NASA Admin Bolden
- Born:
  - Bill Clinton, 42nd President of the United States from 1993 to 2001; as William Jefferson Blythe III, at 8:51 a.m. in Hope, Arkansas
  - Charles F. Bolden Jr., American space shuttle astronaut, and NASA administrator from 2009 to 2017; in Columbia, South Carolina
  - Dawn Steel, 20th-century American film producer and the first woman to serve as president of a major U.S. film studio (as president of Columbia Pictures from 1987 to 1990); in The Bronx, New York City (d. 1997)
  - Christopher Malcolm, Scottish stage, television and film actor; in Aberdeen (d. 2014)
  - Masoud Behnoud, Iranian investigative reporter and author; in Tehran

== August 20, 1946 (Tuesday) ==
- Bob Feller of the Cleveland Indians became the first Major League Baseball pitcher to have the speed of his throw measured by radar, with a U.S. Army "lumiline chronograph" clocking him at 98.6 mph at a game in Washington, D.C. against the Senators. Feller's Indians lost, 5–4.
- The Pittsburgh Pirates voted against joining a labor union, the American Baseball Guild. The election was conducted by the Pennsylvania Labor Relations Board, and only 19 of the 31 eligible players participated. With one vote invalidated, the margin was 15–3 against unionizing. In 1965, the Major League Baseball Players Association would be created for members of all of the MLB teams.
- Born:
  - N. R. Narayana Murthy, Indian businessman and founder of Infosys Technologies; in Mysore
  - Connie Chung, American news anchor; as Constance Yu-Hwa Chung in Washington, D.C
  - Ralf Hütter, German techno singer and musician for Kraftwerk; in Krefeld
- Died:
  - Fielding H. Yost, 75, American college football coach known for his "point-a-minute" offenses scored when he coached the University of Michigan from 1901 to 1905
  - Vojtech Tuka, 66, former Prime Minister and Foreign Minister of the Nazi puppet state Slovak Republic, 1939–1944, was executed

== August 21, 1946 (Wednesday) ==
- In Marburg in the American zone of Germany, the bodies of Frederick the Great, who ruled Prussia from 1740 to 1786, and his father Frederick William I of Prussia (who ruled 1713–1740) were reburied after having been removed from Potsdam in 1943. The ceremony was presided over by Louis Ferdinand, Prince of Prussia, grandson of the last Kaiser of Germany and the eldest son of former Crown Prince Wilhelm. Louis Ferdinand, pretender to the throne from 1951 to 1994, lived to see the reinterment of the kings in Potsdam in 1991, following the reunification of Germany.

== August 22, 1946 (Thursday) ==

- Döme Sztójay, who had served as Prime Minister of Hungary during occupation by the Nazi Germany, was executed by a firing squad after being convicted of treason and crimes against humanity.
- The Seoul National University was established in Korea on the campus of the former Keijo Imperial University, and included colleges of arts and sciences, engineering, agriculture, law, education, commerce, arts, medicine and dentistry.

== August 23, 1946 (Friday) ==
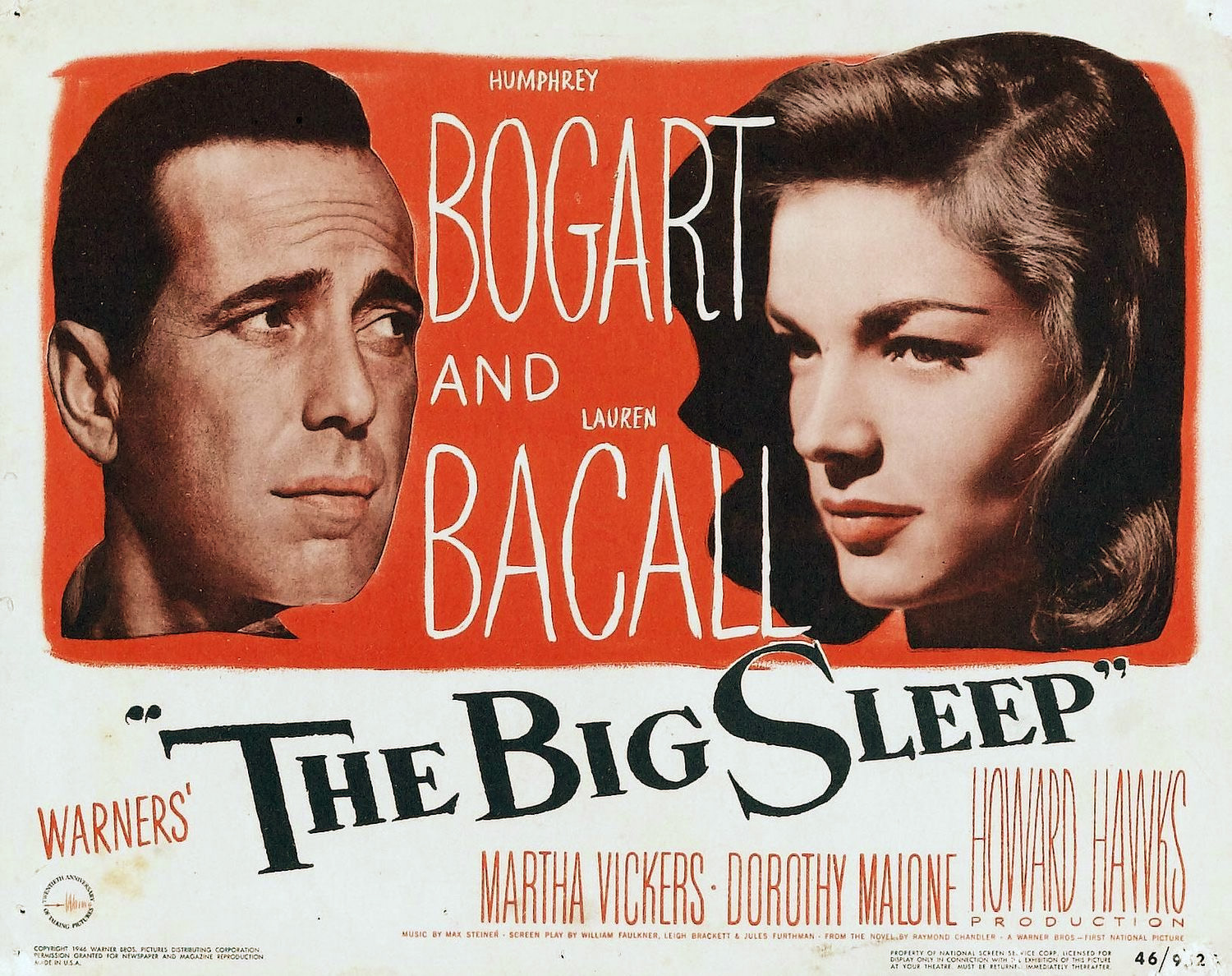

- The State of North Rhine-Westphalia, with Düsseldorf as its capital, was established in the British occupation zone of Germany by Ordinance No. 46, an order of the zone's Military Governor, Sir Sholto Douglas.
- The Big Sleep, based on the mystery by Raymond Chandler and starring Humphrey Bogart and Lauren Bacall, was released.
- Frontier guards at Khist-Tepe in the Kunduz Province of Afghanistan were digging a foundation for a cattle shed and struck a buried vase containing 626 ancient Greek silver coins that had been buried 2000 years earlier.
- Born: Keith Moon, English rock drummer for The Who; in Wembley, London (d.1978)

== August 24, 1946 (Saturday) ==
- Norma Jean Baker agreed to a suggestion by Ben Lyon, talent manager at 20th Century Fox signing a contract for the first time with her new stage name. Borrowing the names of actress Marilyn Miller, and her mother, Gladys Monroe Baker, she became Marilyn Monroe.
- Philippine Communist leader Juan Feleo disappeared and was presumed killed, triggering the eight year insurgency called the Hukbalahap or Huk Rebellion.
- Elijah Muhammad was released from federal prison in Milan, Michigan after four years, and became the American Nation of Islam's undisputed leader.
- The House of Representatives of Japan approved the nation's new Constitution by a vote of 421 to 8. The House of Councillors would approve it later in the year.
- Died: James McReynolds, 84, U.S. Supreme Court Justice from 1914 to 1941

== August 25, 1946 (Sunday) ==
- The body of former Italian dictator Benito Mussolini was secretly moved from Milan police headquarters to the nearby Capuchin Monastery in Cerro Maggiore. On the same day, the body of former President of Germany, Paul von Hindenburg, was quietly reburied at the Elizabeth Church in Marburg, 12 years after his death and 19 months after retreating Nazis had removed it from the Tannenberg Memorial to avoid its capture by Soviet forces.
- Born:
  - Charles Ghigna, American children's author famous as "Father Goose"; in Bayside, New York
  - Rollie Fingers, American MLB pitcher and Hall of Fame enshrinee; in Steubenville, Ohio

== August 26, 1946 (Monday) ==
- The United States consented to the jurisdiction of the International Court of Justice, popularly known as the World Court. The U.S. would withdraw its acceptance on October 7, 1985.
- Walter Schreiber, a Wehrmacht Medical Corps general, testified in the Nuremberg Trials against Hermann Goering in the genocide of Europe's Jews.
- Born:
  - Valerie Simpson, American singer and half of the duo of Ashford & Simpson; in New York City
  - Mark Snow, American composer; in New York City
  - Zhou Ji, Chinese Minister of Education; in Shanghai
  - Alison Steadman, British actress; in Liverpool

== August 27, 1946 (Tuesday) ==
- A milestone in vascular surgery was achieved when Portuguese surgeon João Cid dos Santos performed the removal of plaque from an artery, a procedure now referred to as an endarterectomy.

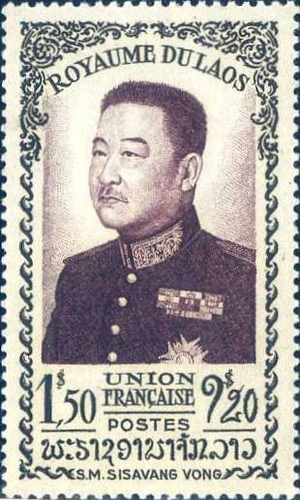
King Sisavang Vong

- Owners of baseball's National League and American League teams met and secretly voted 15–1 to retain the ban against African-Americans, on grounds that integration of the game would be harmful to the Negro leagues. The dissenting vote was from Branch Rickey, owner of the Brooklyn Dodgers, who then went to Commissioner Happy Chandler to overturn the ruling.
- France signed a treaty with Laos establishing a protectorate and recognizing Sisavang Vong, King of Luang Prabang, as the nation's monarch.
- Born: Flossie Wong-Staal, Chinese-born American biochemist and co-discoverer (with Robert Gallo) of the human immunodeficiency virus (HIV); as Wong Yee Ching in Guangzhou (d. 2020)

== August 28, 1946 (Wednesday) ==
- The Sudanese Defense Force massacred 46 Eritrean civilians and injured 60 in Asmara after a Sudanese soldier had been killed by a resident.

== August 29, 1946 (Thursday) ==
- The Workers Party of North Korea was created by a merger of the Communist Party and the New People's Party, with Kim Tu-bong as chairman, and Kim Il Sung and Chu Yong-ha as vice chairmen.
- Born:
  - Bob Beamon, American athlete who held the world record for the long jump for 23 years; in Jamaica, Queens, New York City
  - Dimitris Christofias, President of Cyprus 2008 to 2013; in Dikomo (d. 2019)
- Died: Grigory Mikhaylovich Semyonov, 55, who had fled the Soviet Union in 1921 to Korea under Japanese protection, then provided intelligence to the Japanese throughout World War II. Captured by the Soviets in 1945 after the Japanese surrender, Semyonov was convicted of treason and hanged.

== August 30, 1946 (Friday) ==
- The United States signed an agreement to sell (for $20,000,000) surplus aircraft to the government of Chiang Kai-shek's Republic of China, effectively ruining negotiations being conducted by General George C. Marshall between Chiang and Communist Party leader Mao Zedong.
- The German state of Rheinland-Pfalz was created from the northern section of the French occupation zone of Germany by the French Governor, Marie Pierre Kœnig.
- Died: Jack Woolams, chief test pilot for the X-1, was killed while performing at an airshow when his P-39 Airacobra fighter crashed into Lake Ontario. Captain Chuck Yeager would break the sound barrier in the X-1-1 on October 14, 1947.

== August 31, 1946 (Saturday) ==
- John Hersey's article "Hiroshima," later to be published as a bestselling book, first appeared in The New Yorker with the stories of six survivors of the blast, filling the entire issue.
- The last French troops left Lebanon, departing Beirut for Marseille.
