= Antonio De Berti =

Dalmatian Italian politician (1889–1952)

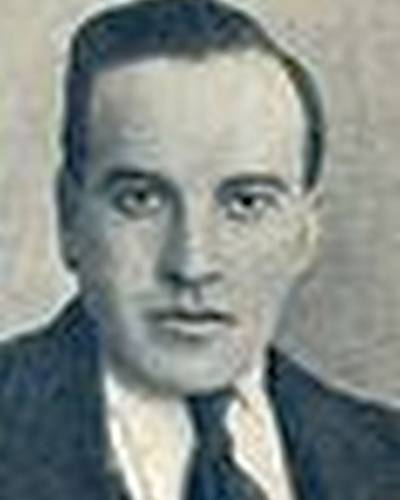

Member of the Chamber of Deputies
- In office 11 June 1921 – 25 January 1925
- Constituency: Istria

Personal details
- Born: 9 July 1889 Pago, Austria-Hungary
- Died: 5 February 1952 (aged 62) Rome, Italy
- Party: Independent
- Other political affiliations: PRSI, PSLI/PSDI
- Spouse: Rosita Gambini
- Education: University of Graz

Antonio De Berti (7 September 1889 – 2 May 1952) was a Dalmatian Italian politician, deputy, and irredentist.

== Biography ==
De Berti was born in Pago, Austria-Hungary, which is in the present-day Croatia, into an Italian family of Lombard descent. He started his studies in Zara; however, the untimely death of his father Antonio forced his family to move away from the city. They first resettled in Trieste, and later in Pola. As a student, De Berti was arrested for his Italian irredentist ideals, and because of this was persecuted, being arrested and condemned. Among the reasons of his arrests was libel because of his writings in the radical periodical he co-founded in Pola, namely La Fiamma (1911–1912). The newspaper had to be closed after just two years. He also contributed to Trieste's newspaper L'Emancipazione, and participated in the first congress of the Fascio Giovanile Istriano in Capodistria. He founded the daily L'Azione in Pola after the city passed to Italy in 1919, the Camera del lavoro italiana, and Istria's section of the Italian Reformist Socialist Party. The newspaper criticized both international socialism and the old national liberalism. He participated in the local elections on 15 May 1921, and was elected deputy from Istria.

De Berti was very active in parliament, fighting to solve the problems of the irredent lands, particularly of his city of adoption, Pola, endeavouring to build a shipyard at the city's Scoglio Olivi. He was in conflict with the Italian fascists, who challenged his L'Azione with their Il Nuovo Giornale and L'Istria nuova. His newspaper was forced to close and De Berti to ask to be dismissed as a deputy. The newspaper's closure lasted one week, and the Kingdom of Italy's Chamber of Deputies rejected his resignation.

Under pressure, De Berti eventually had to give away his newspaper L'Azione, which eventually passed to the National Fascist Party. He did not participate in the 1924 Italian general election, and he joined the opposition central committee of Ivanoe Bonomi. He made a last political attempt with the newspaper L'Arena di Pola (June–September 1925), confident in a "constitutional turn of events supported by the king". As this did not materialize, a disappointed De Berti retired from politics to focus on his profession and his family. During his retirement, he remained the point of reference for the anti-fascists in Istria. He was constantly surveilled by the police. He was married to Rosita Gambini, daughter of Istria's prominent politician and lawyer Pierantonio. The two married on 25 April 1925.

After the fall of Fascism, Bonomi of the Labour Democratic Party invited De Berti to Rome to resume his political activity in parliament; he chose to be appointed temporary prefectural commissioner for the commune of Pola. During his brief time of 12 days in September 1943, he incited the Italian forces in Istria to militarily oppose the Germans, all to no avail. The latter then forced him to retire in the countryside, at Semedella, near Koper. During this time, he kept in touch with Trieste's National Liberation Committee but firmly opposed collaboration with the Yugoslavs due to their wish of annexing Istria and Dalmatia. He was arrested by the Germans in 1944 and remained incarcerated for some months.

In 1945, De Berti founded the Comitato Giuliano in Rome, and pressed for the re-foundation of the newspaper L'Arena di Pola. Meanwhile, he founded the daily La Ricostruzione in Rome. He also promoted the creation of the clandestine radio Radio Venezia Giulia in Venice. He was with Alcide De Gasperi at the 1945 Council of Foreign Ministers in London and at the 1947 Paris Peace Conference as an expert of the irredent lands. He supported the annexation of the Venezia Giulia, and later opposed the ratification of the Treaty of Paris between Italy and the Allied Powers. He later joined the Socialist Party of Italian Workers, which became the Italian Democratic Socialist Party. He was later nominated counselor of the state, and joined the superior board of the armed forces. In 1951, he became head of cabinet under Saragat, and minister of the merchant navy. De Berti died in Rome on 2 May 1952. His funerals were held in Rome and Trieste.

== See also ==
- Italian irredentism in Dalmatia

== Bibliography ==
- Necrology in L'Arena di Pola (Gorizia), 7 maggio 1952;
- Atti parlamentari, Camera, Discussioni, XXVI legisl. (1921-23), ad Ind.;
- P. A. Quarantotti Gambini, Primavera a Trieste, Milano 1951, pp. 19, 31, 35, 44;
- L. Giusti, A. D., in Difesa adriatica (Roma), 10 maggio 1952;
- G. L. Aiello, Ricordo di A. D., ibid., 21 luglio 1952;
- P. A. Quarantotti Gambini, Ricordo di A. D., in'Trieste, II (1955), 7, pp. 23 s.;
- S. Cella, Giornalismo e stampa periodica in Istria, in Atti e mem. della Soc. istr. di archeol. e storia Patria, n. s., IV (1956), pp. 141 s., 144 s. e schede 71, 81, 84, 86, 95;
- Id., "La Fiamma" di Pola (1911-12), in Pagine istriane, s. 3, XXXII (1958), pp. 3-8;
- G. Quarantotti, La vita e l'opera di A. D., in Voce giuliana (Trieste), il maggio 1958;
- E. Predonzani, Pietre miliari: il processo "Subietta", in Pagine istriane, s. 3, XXXVI-XXXVII (1959), pp. 3-9;
- Atti e mem. del C. L. N. di Pola, a cura di P. De Simone, La vana battaglia per il plebiscito, Gorizia 1960, pp. 47-69 e passim;
- L'artiv. a Parigi dei deleg. giuliani, ibid. 1960, pp. 7-35 e passim;
- La strada controversa dell'ultima difesa, ibid. 1962, pp. 15-54 e passim;
- S. Cella, I reggitori di Pola, in Atti e mem. della Soc. istr. di archeol. est. patria, n. s., IX (1961), pp. 69 s.;
- E. Apili, Italia, fascismo e antifascismo nella Venezia Giulia (1918-1943), Bari 1966, pp. 64, 162, 218;
- G. Miglia, Dentro l'Istria, diario 1945-1947, Trieste 1973, pp. 40 s., 109-12, 129, 152;
- D. De Castro, La questione di Trieste, Trieste 1981, I, pp. 386, 432, 498;
- Storia di un esodo, Istria 1945-1956, Trieste 1980, pp. 200-04, 279-81;
- S. Cella, L'Istria fra le due guerre mondiali, in Atti e mem. della Soc. istr. di archeol. e storia patria, n. s., XXIX-XXX (1982), pp. 164 s., 175;
- R. Tankovich, Il caso di Pola, Gorizia 1985, pp. 97-181 passim.
