= July 1946 =

Month of 1946

<<	July 1946					>>
Su	Mo	Tu	We	Th	Fr	Sa
	1	2	3	4	5	6
7	8	9	10	11	12	13
14	15	16	17	18	19	20
21	22	23	24	25	26	27
28	29	30	31

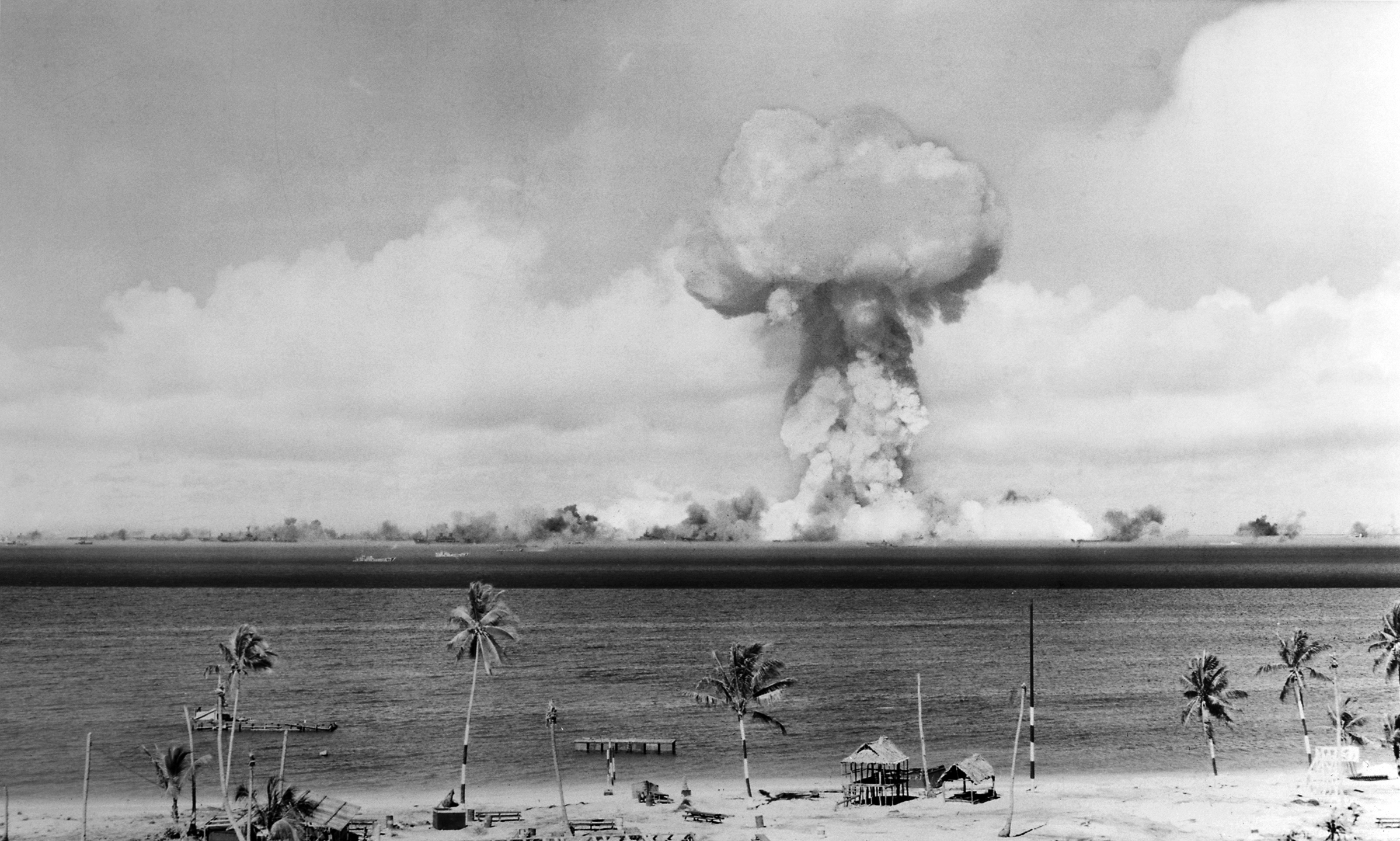
July 1, 1946: Bikini Atoll and 73 ships nuked

July 4, 1946: U.S. grantes the Philippines independence

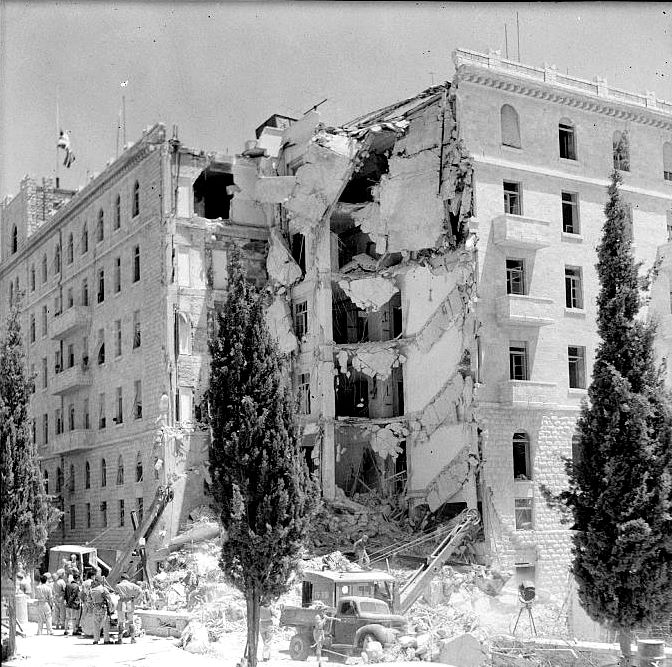
July 22, 1946: 91 killed in Zionists bombing of Jerusalem's King David Hotel

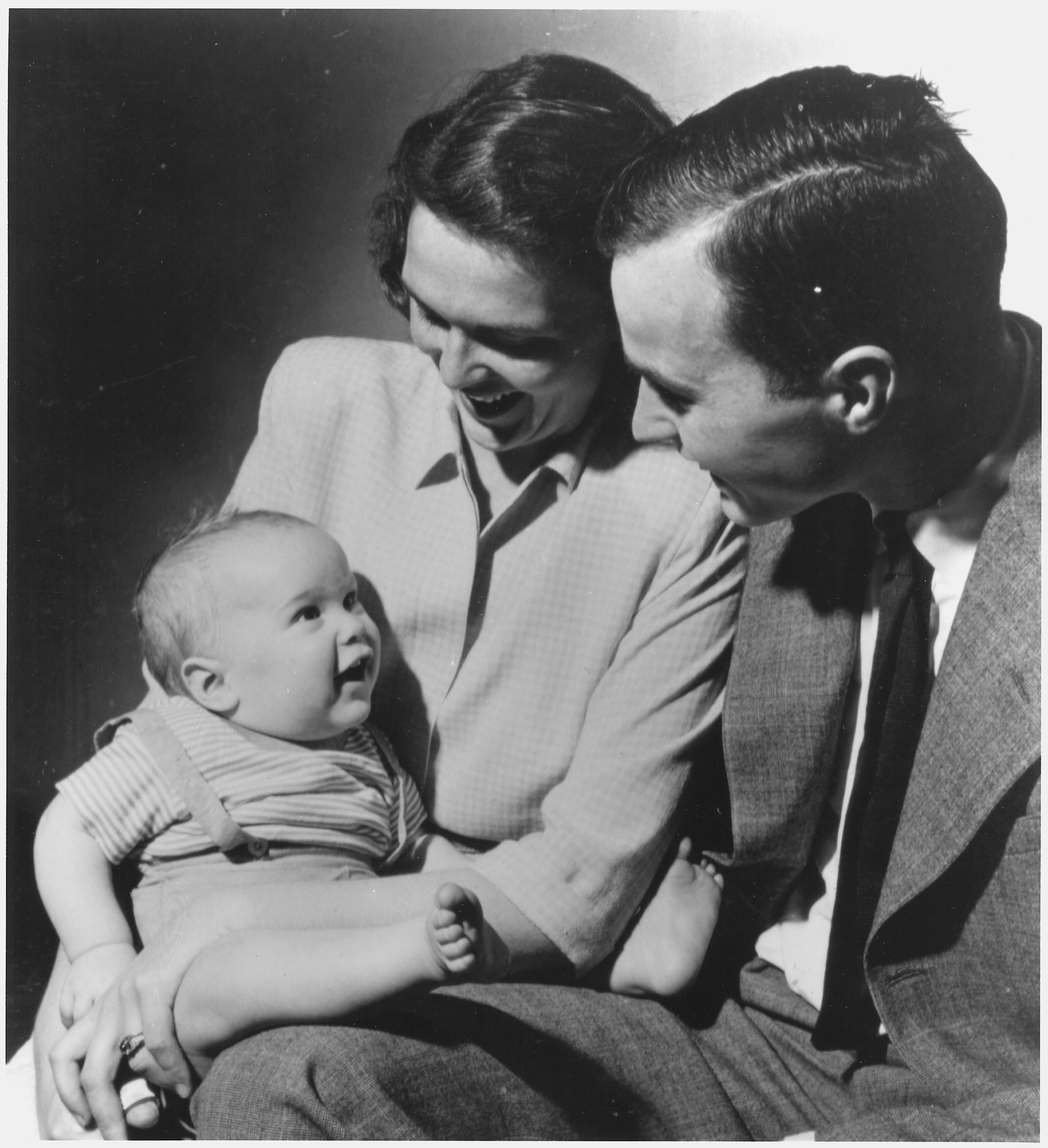
July 6, 1946: Future U.S. President George W. Bush born to future U.S. President George H.W. Bush and future First Lady Barbara Bush

July 25, 1946: First underwater nuclear explosion

The following events occurred in July 1946:

== July 1, 1946 (Monday) ==
- At 8:59 am and 45 seconds local time, Operation Crossroads was carried out as a fleet of 73 retired and unmanned ships were destroyed, sunk or damaged by an atomic bomb. The test took place at the Bikini Atoll in the South Pacific Ocean to observe what a nuclear weapon could do to American warships. It was only the fourth time in human history that a nuclear explosion had taken place. For the first time, news reporters and representatives of the rest of the world's nations had been invited. The explosion took place at 2159:45 UTC on June 30 (5:59 pm EST). The transport USS Gilliam, closest to the blast, and USS Carlisle sank immediately, while the destroyer USS Lamson was capsized. The heavily armored Japanese ship Sakawa sank the next day. Animals on the USS Burleson died of radiation poisoning over the weeks after initially showing normal bloodcounts.
- The Communicable Disease Center (CDC), a federal agency now known as the Centers for Disease Control and Prevention (CDC) began operations in Atlanta as a branch of the United States Public Health Service, initially as a domestic program to eradicate malaria.

== July 2, 1946 (Tuesday) ==
- The Luce–Celler Act of 1946 was signed into law, giving all Philippines citizens living in the United States the right to become naturalized U.S. citizens.
- In the American Zone of Germany, Lt. Gen. Lucius D. Clay, the Deputy Military Governor, pardoned all Nazis under 27 years old, except for those accused of war crimes, and restored one million men to German citizenship. One commentator noted, "Clay acted on the assumption that many of these Germans became Nazis before they were old enough to realize what they were doing."
- The town of Kerman was incorporated in Fresno County, California.
- The film noir The Stranger starring Edward G. Robinson, Loretta Young and Orson Welles (who also directed) was released.
- Born: Richard Axel, American neuroscientist, 2004 Nobel Prize laureate, in New York City
- Died:
  - Howard Hyde Russell, 89, founder, Anti-Saloon League
  - Mary Alden, 63, American stage & screen actress

== July 3, 1946 (Wednesday) ==
- U.S. President Truman signed the National Mental Health Act into law, establishing National Institute of Mental Health and funding research into mental illness.
- For the first time, Czechoslovakia had a Communist leader, as party First Secretary Klement Gottwald, was named as the new prime minister by President Edvard Beneš.
- Born: Johnny Lee, American singer and songwriter, as John Lee Ham in Texas City, Texas

== July 4, 1946 (Thursday) ==
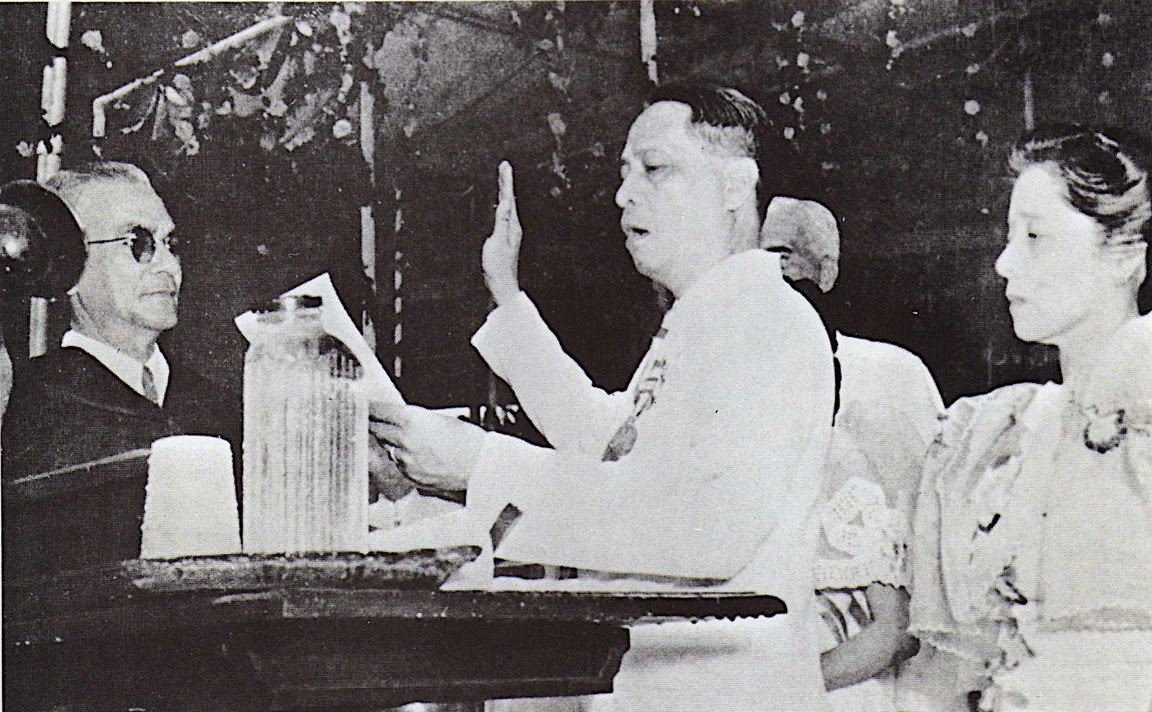
President Roxas

- The Republic of the Philippines was born, and Manuel Roxas was inaugurated as its first president. Forty-eight years after the United States had first claimed the islands as an American territory, U.S. President Harry S. Truman issued a formal proclamation that "On behalf of the United States of America, I do hereby recognize the independence of the Philippines as a separate and self-governing nation and acknowledge the authority and control over the same of the government instituted by the people thereof, under the constitution now in force." Present at the raising of the Philippine flag were General Douglas MacArthur and U.S. Senator Millard Tydings, and Emilio Aguinaldo, who had begun the fight for independence in 1898.
- The Kielce pogrom took place in Poland, where more than 40 residents of Kielce's Jewish neighborhood were murdered by a mob, without intervention by the police. Walenty Blaszczyk guided police to the Jewish section of the town after saying that his 8-year-old son had escaped after being held hostage by a group of Jews, Forty years later, the boy, now a retired 59-year old pensioner who was still living in Kielce, told a Polish government inquest that his father had told him to lie to the police in order to justify the murders.
- Born:
  - Michael Milken, American "junk bond" financier, in Encino, California
  - Ron Kovic, author of Born on the Fourth of July, in Ladysmith, Wisconsin

== July 5, 1946 (Friday) ==
- At the Piscine Molitor in Paris, model Micheline Bernardini became the first woman to wear a two-piece swimsuit created by designer Louis Réard. In an homage to the site of the atomic bomb test earlier in the week, Reard named the garment the bikini.

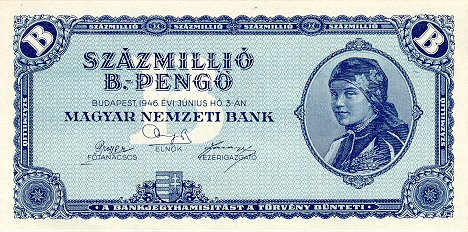
100,000,000,000,000,000 pengős

- As inflation in Hungary spiraled out of control, the national bank in Budapest put into circulation an unprecedented note of currency, a bill for one hundred quintillion (100,000,000,000,000,000) pengős.
- Leo Durocher, the manager of baseball's Brooklyn Dodgers, first uttered what would become a famous phrase, after the New York Giants beat them 7–6 to rise from last place to 7th in the National League. Frank Graham, a reporter for the Journal-American, wrote in his Sunday column that Durocher had pointed to the Giants' dugout and said, "The nice guys are all over there, in seventh place." Durocher recalled the remark nearly 30 years later as "Take a look at them. All nice guys. They'll finish last." The remark continued to be paraphrased, and in April 1948, Cosmopolitan magazine published an article about Durocher with the title "Nice Guys Finish Last".
- Born: Gwyneth Powell, British TV actress known for Grange Hill; in Levenshulme, Lancashire

== July 6, 1946 (Saturday) ==
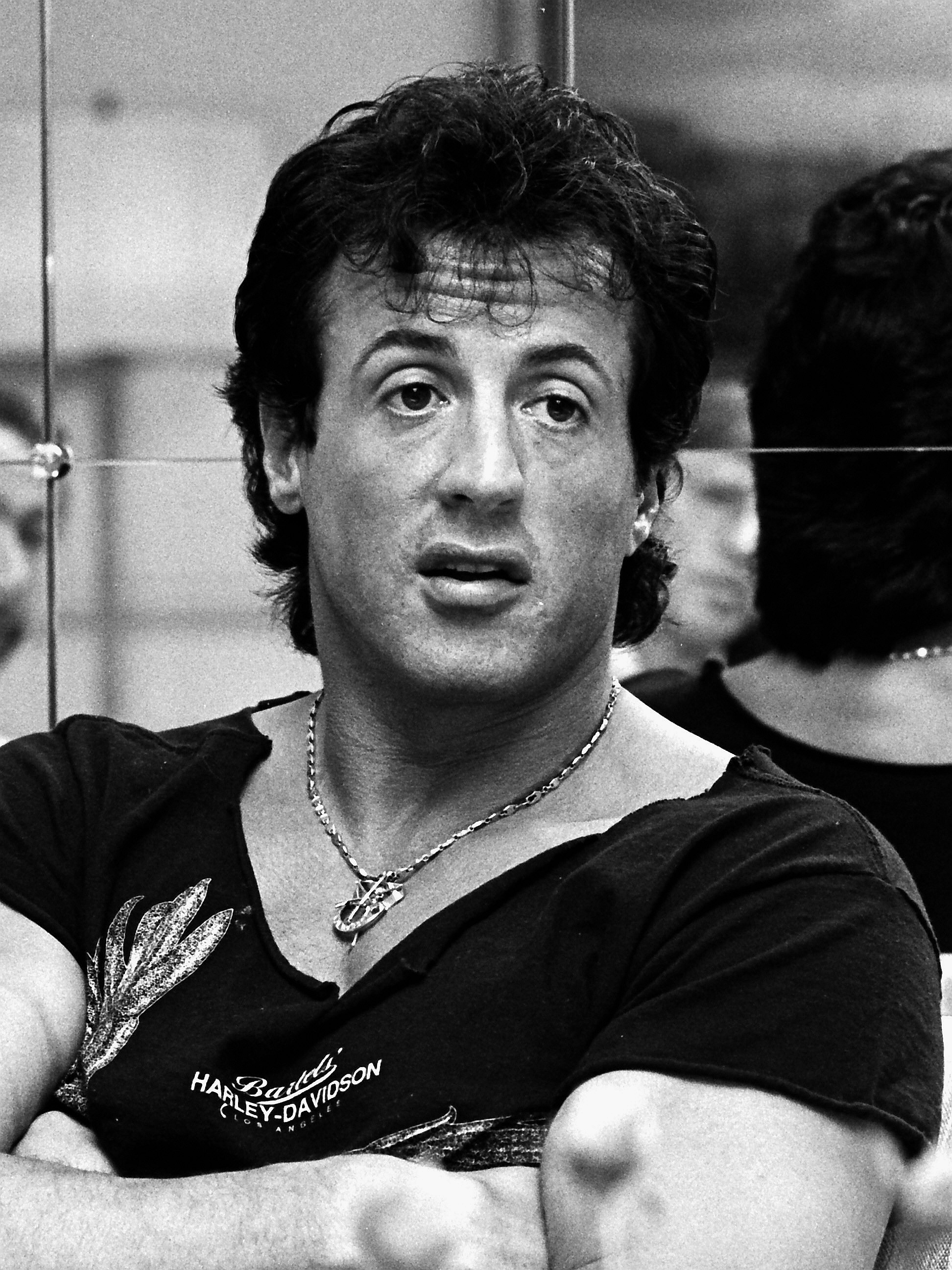
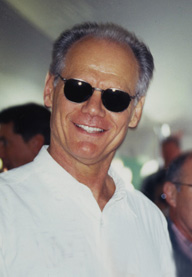
George W. Bush, Sylvester Stallone and Fred Dryer, born July 6, 1946
- A mob of hundreds of youths in Trieste threw rocks and stones at Allied military police in protest of the four-power decision to internationalize the city.
- Born:
  - George Walker Bush, 43rd President of the United States, in New Haven, Connecticut, the son of Yale University student George Bush and Barbara Bush.
  - Sylvester Enzio Stallone, American film actor (Rocky and Rambo), in New York City to Frank Stallone Sr. and Jackie Stallone; he was injured during the delivery, leaving him with a drooping lower lip and what would become a slight, but distinctive, speech impediment.
  - John Frederick Dryer, American pro football player and television actor (Hunter), in Hawthorne, California to Charles and Genevieve Dryer.

== July 7, 1946 (Sunday) ==
- Mother Frances Xavier Cabrini (1850–1917) became the first American citizen to be elevated to sainthood in the Roman Catholic Church, canonized under the authority of Pope Pius XII. Mother Cabrini, a native of Italy, came to the United States in 1889 and began a career of founding schools and hospitals. She became a U.S. citizen on October 9, 1909, and had been beatified on November 13, 1938.
- Miguel Alemán Valdés was elected President of Mexico, defeating opposition candidate Ezequiel Padilla.
- In Philadelphia, a joint announcement was released by the Presbyterian Church and the Episcopal Church for a merger that, ultimately, did not take place.
- U.S. Navy Ensign Jimmy Carter, who would become the 39th President of the United States, married Rosalynn Smith in Plains, Georgia. In 2021, they would become the first former U.S. President and First Lady to celebrate a 75th wedding anniversary.

== July 8, 1946 (Monday) ==
- The Soviet military government in Austria began deporting 54,000 persons who had moved there from Germany following the 1938 Anschluss, after setting a deadline of 6:00 am the day before.
- Died: Orrick Johns, 59, American writer, by suicide

== July 9, 1946 (Tuesday) ==
- In the 1946 Major League Baseball All-Star Game in Boston, Ted Williams helped the American League win 12-0 over the Nationals, getting a hit in all four times at-bat, getting two home runs and five RBIs.
- Born:
  - Bon Scott, Scottish-born Australian rock musician, lead singer for AC/DC, as Ronald B. Scott in Forfar, Angus (died of alcohol poisoning, 1980).
  - Mitch Mitchell, English drummer for and last surviving member of the Jimi Hendrix Experience, in Ealing, Middlesex (d. 2008)

== July 10, 1946 (Wednesday) ==
- In Hungary, the hyperinflation peaked at a rate of 348.46% per day.
- Jawaharlal Nehru, the Congress President, held a press conference in Bombay declaring that while the Congress had agreed to partake in the Constituent Assembly, it reserved the right to modify the Cabinet Mission Plan as it saw fit.
- Died: Sidney Hillman, 59, American labor leader and President of the Amalgamated Clothing Workers of America

== July 11, 1946 (Thursday) ==
- At the meeting in Paris of the foreign ministers of the four Allied powers who were carrying out the post-war Occupation of Germany, U.S. Secretary of State James F. Byrnes proposed an economic merger of the occupation zones. The United Kingdom agreed on July 29, and the American and British zones would become the "United Economic Area", informally referred to as "Bizonia", on January 1, 1947. The French zone would join in 1949, and the three areas would become West Germany later that year.
- Born: Ed Markey, American politician, U.S. Senator for Massachusetts since 2013; in Malden, Massachusetts

== July 12, 1946 (Friday) ==
- Hungary initiated a monetary reform that retired its worthless currency, the pengő, and replaced it with the forint, effective August 1.
- The Coal Industry Nationalisation Act 1946 became law in the United Kingdom.
- Died: Ray Stannard Baker, 76, American journalist (McClure's) who also wrote children's books under the name "David Grayson"

== July 13, 1946 (Saturday) ==
- Seven United States Marines were taken prisoner in China's Hebei Province by Communist forces, at the village of Hsinanchuang, near Qinhuangdao. A truce team secured the men's release after eleven days.
- Born: Cheech Marin, American actor and comedian as Richard Anthony Marin in Los Angeles
- Died:
  - Alfred Stieglitz, 82, American photographer
  - Riley Puckett, 52, country music singer and comedian

== July 14, 1946 (Sunday) ==
- The Common Sense Book of Baby and Child Care, by pediatrician Benjamin Spock, was published for the first time and would become an immediate bestseller as a guide to be bought by millions of parents for the raising of their children. A contemporary review, published in The New York Times on the day of the book's release by the Duell, Sloan and Pearce publishing company, began with the sentence, "You know more than you think you do", and advised parents not to adhere to strict rules that had been given in previous child care guides.
- The "Boudreau shift" was first employed by Lou Boudreau, manager and shortstop for the Cleveland Indians, in the second game of doubleheader against the Boston Red Sox. After Boston's Ted Williams hit three home runs to beat Cleveland 11–10, Boudreau moved all four infielders and two outfielders to the right side of the field when the left-handed Williams came to bat again. The Indians still lost, 6–4.
- Born:
  - John Wood, Australian TV actor known for Blue Heelers
  - Vincent Pastore, American actor known for The Sopranos; in The Bronx, New York City (d. 2026)

== July 15, 1946 (Monday) ==
- A loan of 3.75 billion dollars to the United Kingdom, at 1.62 percent interest, was approved 46–34 by the United States Senate, after the House had voted 219–155 in its favor. By July 15, 1947, "within six months of convertibility of sterling requirements coming into force", noted one historian later, "British gold and dollar reserves were exhausted. With bankruptcy staring it in the face, the Attlee government made plans for a severe austerity program at home and a strategic retrenchment abroad."
- President Truman presented the Presidential distinguished unit citation banner to the members of the 442nd Regiment of the U.S. Army, in a White House ceremony. Truman praised the regiment, made up of Japanese-American citizens, "for victory over both the enemy and over prejudice".
- Born:
  - Linda Ronstadt, American singer and songwriter, in Tucson, Arizona
  - Hassanal Bolkiah, Sultan of Brunei since 1967, at Bandar Seri Begawan
- Died: Wen Yiduo, 46, Chinese poet and activist, was assassinated hours after he delivered the eulogy at a funeral for Li Gongpu.

== July 16, 1946 (Tuesday) ==
- The Bureau of Land Management was created within the U.S. Department of the Interior, by a merger of two other agencies, the Grazing Service and the United States General Land Office.
- The Social Security Administration was established to replace the three member Social Security Board that had been created in 1935.
- Born:
  - Ron Yary, American NFL tackle and Hall of Famer, in Chicago
  - Barbara Lee, American politician, Mayor-elect of Oakland California, former congresswoman, in El Paso
  - Dave Goelz, American puppeteer, in Burbank, California

== July 17, 1946 (Wednesday) ==
- After formerly being limited to general elections only, African Americans voted in a primary election in Georgia for the first time, with more than 100,000 turning out to decide on the Democratic Party nominee for Governor. Although the black vote was a factor in James V. Carmichael getting more votes than former Governor Eugene Talmadge (314,421 to 305,777), Talmadge won the nomination anyway, based on the state's "county unit" system, similar to an electoral vote. Talmadge won the general election in November, but died a month later before he could be inaugurated. The unit vote system was later abolished.
- A plane crash in Ecuador killed all 26 passengers and 6 crew members on board. The Andesa Airlines flight from Guayaquil, piloted by two Americans, struck a hillside while attempting a landing at Cuenca.
- Born: Gerald Gallego, American serial killer, in Sacramento (d. 2002)
- Died: Gen. Draza Mihailovic, 50, and 8 other Chetniks were executed by a firing squad in Belgrade, after being convicted of collaborating with German invaders during World War II.

== July 18, 1946 (Thursday) ==
- The Dr. Hari Singh Gour University was founded in the city of Sagar, now in the Madhya Pradesh state in India, and is now one of the central universities operated by the national government.
- In fiction, from J. D. Salinger's novel The Catcher in the Rye, July 18, 1946, was the date that Holden Caulfield's younger brother, Allie, died of leukemia.
- Died: Maceo Snipes, African American veteran, was murdered after voting in the Taylor County, Georgia Democratic Primary.

== July 19, 1946 (Friday) ==
- Introduced for the first time and endorsed by President Truman, the proposed Equal Rights Amendment to the United States Constitution, failed to pass the U.S. Senate. Although the vote was 38–35 in favor of the proposal, a 2/3 majority was required for passage.
- Born: Ilie Năstase, Romanian tennis player, #1 in the world 1973–74, winner of U.S. Open, Wimbledon and French Open 1972–73; in Bucharest

== July 20, 1946 (Saturday) ==
- The "Report of the Joint Committee on the Investigation of the Pearl Harbor Attack" was released. Chaired by U.S. Senator Alben W. Barkley, with U.S. Representative Jere Cooper as vice-chairman, the ten member committee had voted 8–2 to approve the finding that "The committee has found no evidence to support the charges, made before and during the hearings, that the President, the Secretary of State, the Secretary of War, or the Secretary of Navy tricked, provoked, incited, cajoled, or coerced Japan into attacking this Nation in order that a declaration of war might be more easily obtained from the Congress", and assigned blame to the highest-ranking officers in Hawaii at the time, Admiral Husband E. Kimmel and Lt. Gen. Walter C. Short. U.S. Senators Homer Ferguson and Owen Brewster dissented, saying that President Roosevelt and his military advisors "were just as responsible for the nation's worst military disaster".
- Born: Leonard Lake, American serial killer, in San Francisco (d. 1985)

== July 21, 1946 (Sunday) ==
- Gualberto Villarroel, the President of Bolivia, was murdered by an angry mob that stormed the Palacio Quemado, his official residence in La Paz. Villaroel, who had escaped an assassination attempt only two years earlier, was hanged from a lamppost at the Plaza Murillo after the killing.
- For the first time in history of the United Kingdom the rationing of bread was put into effect. By order of the Ministry of Food, with a 305–182 approval by the House of Commons,
- Lieutenant Commander James J. Davidson became the first American to land a jet airplane on to an aircraft carrier, guiding an FH-1 Phantom onto the deck of the USS Franklin D. Roosevelt after taking off from the ship earlier.
- Born: Kenneth Starr, American attorney who prosecuted Bill Clinton in 1998; in Vernon, Texas (d. 2022)

== July 22, 1946 (Monday) ==
- The King David Hotel in Jerusalem was attacked by the Zionist resistance group Irgun, collapsing a section of the building and killing 91 people. At 12:37 pm, 350 kilograms (770 lb) of gelignite explosives were detonated at the headquarters of the British Mandate for Palestine. The 91 dead were made up of 28 British nationals and 41 Palestinian Arabs. Members of Irgun had smuggled the bomb material into the hotel in seven milk cans.
- Born:
  - Danny Glover, American film actor (Lethal Weapon films), in San Francisco
  - Mireille Mathieu, French singer, in Avignon

== July 23, 1946 (Tuesday) ==
- The last German prisoners of war in the United States were released, as 1,385 POWs were placed on the ship General Yates, following detention at Camp Shanks in New York. In all, there had been 375,000 German prisoners kept in the U.S. at the end of World War II.
- The Zaibatsu, the Japanese corporations that had financed that nation's war effort, were abolished by imperial order. Many of the corporations began to be reconstituted in 1953.

== July 24, 1946 (Wednesday) ==
- Andrei Gromyko told a closed session of the United Nations Security Council that the Soviet Union would not accept the Baruch Plan to ban all further production of nuclear weapons.
- Born: Gallagher (Leo Anthony Gallagher, Jr.), American prop comedian, in Fort Bragg, North Carolina (d. 2022)

== July 25, 1946 (Thursday) ==
- In the first underwater test of the atomic bomb, the aircraft carrier USS Saratoga was sunk near Bikini Atoll in the Pacific Ocean. The "Baker Test" blast took place at 8:35 am local time, and vaporised the 200-foot-long (61 m) weapons ship USS LSM-60, located directly above the bomb, and immediately sank the USS Arkansas. In all, three submarines and seven ships were destroyed in the test. The test was the second phase of Operation Crossroads.

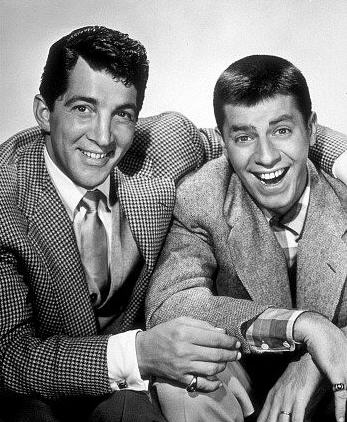
Martin and Lewis

- At the 500 Club in Atlantic City, New Jersey, Dean Martin and Jerry Lewis staged their first show as a comedy duo. Their last performance as a team would happen exactly ten years later, on July 25, 1956.
- Moore's Ford Lynching: Two African American couples, George and Mae Dorsey, and Roger and Dorothy Malcolm, were murdered by a mob of white men, after their car was stopped near Monroe, Georgia. Although the crime aroused outrage across the United States, nobody was ever prosecuted for the murders.

== July 26, 1946 (Friday) ==
- The U.S. Office of Price Administration, authorized to act after a 25-day lapse in its activities, issued orders restoring price controls, but at a higher effectively raising prices on thousands of items sold in the United States. Under the "OPA Revival Act" that had been signed by President Truman the day before, food prices would not be controlled again until August 20.

== July 27, 1946 (Saturday) ==
- Meeting in Bombay, the Executive Council of the Muslim League voted unanimously to reject the Cabinet Mission plan that had been proposed by the United Kingdom to grant independence to British India. A year later, the Muslim provinces became Pakistan (with East Pakistan later becoming Bangladesh), and the Hindu provinces became the Republic of India.
- Died: Gertrude Stein, 72, American writer

== July 28, 1946 (Sunday) ==
- Howard C. Petersen, the Assistant Secretary of War, announced that, in addition to deaths in combat, 131,028 American and Filipino citizens, mostly civilians, had died "as a result of war crimes" from December 7, 1941 until the end of World War II. The group included 91,184 Filipino civilians and 595 American civilians who had been killed as a result of "murder, cruelty and torture, starvation and neglect, or.. other assaults and mistreatment".
- Born: Linda Kelsey, American actress (Lou Grant), in Minneapolis
- Died: Alphonsa Muttathupadathu, 35, Indian nun

== July 29, 1946 (Monday) ==
- The “Anping Incident” occurred in Anping, Hebei Province, where United States forces allied with Chiang Kai-Shek’s nationalist bandit troops clashed with the communist People's Liberation Army. No agreement was reached as to who initiated the conflict. The United States claimed the Communist People's Liberation Army, totalling 300 troops, ambushed a supply convoy of 41 United States Marines. The CCP states the U.S. troops were invading a liberated area resulting in their troops defending the city. In the battle that followed, four Americans and at least fifteen Chinese died.
- Air India began operations under that name after the reorganization of Tata Airlines.
- Born: Ximena Armas, Chilean painter, in Santiago

== July 30, 1946 (Tuesday) ==
- The passenger ship MV Vipya capsized in a storm while traveling on Lake Nyasa near Chilumba in Malawi, drowning 145 of the 194 passengers and crewmen on board. The ship, built by the same company that had constructed RMS Titanic, was only on its fourth trip. Reportedly, the ship's captain refused to return to shore when the vessel began taking on water.
- Born:
  - Neil Bonnett, American NASCAR driver, in Hueytown, Alabama (killed in accident, 1994)
  - Dixie Deans, Scottish football player, in Johnstone
  - Barbara Kopple, American film director, in New York City

== July 31, 1946 (Wednesday) ==
- Working under the codename of the Venona project, American cryptanalyst Meredith Gardner was able to make the first breakthrough in a team project to crack the secret codes used by the Soviet Union in its espionage activities in the United States. After his successful decryption of one encoded phrase within intercepted telegrams, the team was able to deconstruct more of the coded transmissions.
- The Morrison-Grady Plan, proposed by Herbert Morrison of Britain and Henry F. Grady of the U.S., providing for the division of Palestine into three districts, with 17% of the land set aside for up to 100,000 Jewish immigrants, 40% for Palestinian Arabs, and 43% for a neutral zone under British control. The plan was endorsed by President Truman and Prime Minister Attlee, but Jewish and Arab groups both rejected the proposal.
