= Attilio Biseo =

Italian aviator (1901–1966)

- Born: 14 October 1901; Rome, Kingdom of Italy
- Died: 7 July 1966 (aged 64); Rome, Italy
- Military career
- Allegiance: Kingdom of Italy; Italian Social Republic
- Branch: Regia Marina; Regia Aeronautica
- Rank: Air Brigade General
- Commands: 23rd Land Bombardment Wing; 9th Air Brigade "Leone"
- Conflicts: Second Italo-Ethiopian War; Spanish Civil War; World War II
- Awards: Silver Medal of Military Valor; Bronze Medal of Military Valor; Colonial Order of the Star of Italy

Attilio Biseo (Rome, 14 October 1901 – 7 July 1966) was an Italian aviator, powerboat racer, Air Force general during World War II, and the personal pilot of Benito Mussolini during the 1930s.

== Biography ==
=== Early career and interwar years ===
He was born in Rome on 14 October 1901, the son of Vittorio Biseo and Adelia Tommasini, and he enlisted in the Royal Italian Navy, serving on submarines after graduating as Ensign. On 5 September 1923 he was transferred at his request to the newly established Regia Aeronautica, and attended the Varese Flight School. In 1924 he became a seaplane pilot, initially serving at the 141st Seaplane Reconnaissance Squadron based in La Spezia. After a short period at the 25th Seaplane Wing, in January 1925 he was transferred to the School of Aerial Observation. In 1927 he married Miss Elena Fraschetti, with whom he had four children, Stefania, Maurizio, Marcella and Luciana. He participated in Italo Balbo's Western Mediterranean Air Cruise of 1928 and then in the Eastern Mediterranean Air Cruise of 1929. On 25 September 1929 he was appointed aide-de-camp of the Deputy Chief of Staff of the Regia Aeronautica, General Giuseppe Valle, and in the same period he became the personal pilot of the head of the government, Benito Mussolini.

After promotion to captain in 1930, he participated in the Italy-Brazil Transatlantic Air Cruise (17 December 1930 – 15 January 1931) as second pilot of the Savoia-Marchetti S.55 seaplane "I-VALL", piloted by General Valle. He later took part, as the first pilot of the S.55 "I-BISE", in the Decennial Air Cruise, obtaining promotion to the rank of major for extraordinary merits. A fan of powerboating, in 1932 and 1934 he won the classic Pavia-Venice motorboat race on board a SIAI airboat equipped with a Fiat and later a Farina engine. Also in 1932 he won the Montelera Cup held between Pontelagoscuro and Volta Grimana over a distance of 58.747 km.

In 1935 he assumed command of the 12th Fast Bombardment Wing stationed in Montecelio, and subsequently of the "Nastro Azzurro" (Blue Ribbon) training unit. In the summer of the same year he piloted the prototype of the Savoia Marchetti S.79 (I-MAGO) during the visit made by the Chief of Staff of the Air Force, General Valle, in East Africa. On 5 August he flew the S.79 from Massawa to Rome, with a short stop in Cairo, in 11 hours and 45 minutes, at an average speed of 350 km / h. On 23 September the same year, still flying a Savoia Marchetti S.79 which took off from Rome-Urbe, he beat six world records on the Monte Cavo-Monte Nerone-Orbetello circuit: speed over 1,000 km with 500 kg load, average 390 km /h, speed over 1,000 km with 1,000 and 2,000 kg load, average 390 km/h; speed on 2,000 km with 500 and 1,000 kg of average load, 380 km/h (former USA record, 307,234 km/h). The record of 2,000 km without load held by Germany with 344,310 km / h was also beaten. For this feat he was decorated with the Gold Medal of Aeronautic Valor. In February 1937 he flew to Spain the first three S.79 bombers, coming from the 12th Wing, destined to equip the Aviazione Legionaria during the Spanish Civil War. Later in the same year he flew bombing missions in Spain, for which he was awarded the Silver Medal of Military Valor.

Between 20 and 21 August 1937 he took part in the Istres-Damascus-Paris air race aboard a S.79CS (I-BIMU) belonging to the 205th Bombardment Squadron, which he flew alongside Bruno Mussolini; they finished in third place, and Biseo was promoted to colonel and decorated with the silver medal for aeronautical valor. In January 1938 he participated, again together with Bruno Mussolini and Captain Antonio Moscatelli, in the Rome-Dakar-Rio de Janeiro raid of about 9,800 km, completed by three S.79T in little more than 24 hours. He was awarded a second gold medal for aeronautical valor for this feat. In those years he had a relationship with actress Leda Gloria, who in 1938 gave him two twin children, Ilia and Atte.

In 1939 he became director in the new airline LATI, where he collaborated in the establishment of the Rome-Seville-Ilha do Sal-Recife-Rio de Janeiro air link, with airport installations on the Ilha do Sal being built under the supervision of his brother Giovanni. The service was inaugurated in November of the same year, and he temporarily moved to Brazil. Between 1939 and 1941 Charles Ponzi, inventor of the scheme of the same name, worked for LATI as commercial director; he obtained the job thanks to the intercession of Biseo, who was his cousin.

=== World War II and later years ===
When the Kingdom of Italy entered the Second World War on 10 June 1940, Biseo was recalled to Italy to take up the post of Chief of Staff of the 5th Air Division "Eolo". In the same year he was promoted to air brigade general (equivalent to air commodore) for war merits, later taking command of the 23rd Land Bombardment Wing and then of the 9th Air Brigade "Leone", equipped with the new Caproni Ca.313. He was awarded a Bronze Medal of Military Valor for his activities in North Africa in the summer of 1940.

In April 1942, during a secret meeting with the Chief of the General Staff, Marshal of Italy Ugo Cavallero, and with engineer and expert motorist Armando Palanca, he proposed to carry out a demonstrative bombing of New York, codenamed "Operation S", which would be carried out by a single bomber (initially the Piaggio P.23R, later replaced by a CANT Z.511 and then by a Savoia-Marchetti SM.95). This planned action was never carried out due to the worsening of the Italian war situation.

Following the Armistice of Cassibile he was captured by the Germans and briefly imprisoned in Oflag 64/Z in Schokken, Poland, but was released after swearing allegiance to the Italian Social Republic. After the end of the war he left the air force and moved to Chile, where he organized the local commercial aviation. He also worked in Peru, Argentina and Paraguay, before returning to Italy in 1960, to take up the post of director of a private airline operating from Ciampino airport. In 1962 he married in second marriage Piera Pozzolo, who in 1949 had given him a daughter, Sandra. He died in Rome on 7 July 1966.
