= Attilio Craglietto =

Italian educator and politician

- Born: 10 May 1884; Novacco, near Pisino, Austria-Hungary
- Died: 5 September 1966 (aged 82); Gorizia, Italy
- Occupations: Educator, politician

Attilio Craglietto (10 May 1884 – 5 September 1966) was an Italian educator and politician.

== Biography ==
Attilio Craglietto was born on 10 May 1884 in Novacco, near Pisino (present-day Pazin), in Istria, then Austria-Hungary, to Stefano Craglietto, who came from a modest Cherso family, and Pia Ortis.

He started to study in his hometown of Pisino, where he also started his secondary studies, which he completed in Trieste. He went to university in Vienna, where he graduated in 1908 in romance languages. He started teaching in the same year, being appointed professor of French language at the royal gymnasium of Pisino. He taught there until 1916, when, during World War I, the Italian gymnasium was closed down by the Austrian authorities. He was called up by the Austrian army and sent to the camp of Radkersburg in Styria as a "political suspect". He went back to teaching after the war, promoting several initiatives. He was then sent to teach in Pola (Pula) in 1920, where he entered the editorial board of the newspaper L'Azione, and represented the national democrats in the first political block formed in Istria before the first elections in Italian Istria, in spring 1921. In 1922 he became councilor of the municipality of Pola. A convinced Catholic, and a Mazzinian and democrat by education, he opposed the violence of both the Communists and Fascists, being expelled from the board of L'Azione after Mussolini came to power.

In 1923 he retired from political activity, to dedicate himself to his studies. From 1922 to 1927 he was secretary of the Società istriana di archeologia e storia patria, and in 1936 he graduated from the University of Padua with a thesis about Marco Minghetti, published in Gorizia in 1960.

He was put in jail by the Nazis during the 1944 German occupation of Istria, being considered suspicious because of his relations with non-aligned personalities and because of his frankness, but was freed shortly after his incarceration. When the Yugoslav partisans arrived in Istria, he called for a meeting of Italian representatives on 9 May 1945, concerned about the defense of the Italianness in Istria. After the occupation by Anglo-American forces, he and the other representatives decided to combat the Slav pretensions to annexing Istria, carrying out various activities with the Comitato di liberazione nazionale, of which he was offered and accepted the presidency, and founding on 29 July 1945 the newspaper L'Arena di Pola. On one occasion, when a youngster burst into a room where an assembly of the comitato was taking place, and with apprehension delivered to Craglietto the news that the Titoists had sentenced him to death, he held his place and simply replied: "Well, if so it will be, it means that there will be one more dead!", bringing calm into the assembly.

When, in March 1946, Craglietto received in Pola the allied commission, while explaining to them the ethnic-geopolitical situation of Pola, he chose not to use the then general language for international relations, French, though he knew it very well, in order to "strive in every way to save the fate of the Italian citizens". He was then sent to Paris in September 1946 to take part in the Paris Peace Treaties, to strive to obtain a plebiscite for all the Istrian region. However, it was ultimately decided that Istria would be annexed by Yugoslavia, and Craglietto and the Comitato di liberazione nazionale had instead to face the organization of the Istrian–Dalmatian exodus.

Craglietto then moved to Italy, in Gorizia, where he became president of the scientific lyceum Duca degli Abruzzi, holding this post for ten years; meanwhile he continued with his studies, mostly on historical linguistics. He died in Gorizia on 5 September 1966.
