= 1946 French India local elections =

Elections to municipal councils in the 22 municipalities of French India were held by universal direct suffrage on June 23, 1946. The National Democratic Front captured power in all 22 municipalities, winning 101 out of 122 municipal seats up for election. Kamal Ghosh, a National Democratic Front leader, became mayor of Chandernagore.
