= Vergarola explosion =

1946 explosion in Pula, Croatia

Amateur photo of the explosion

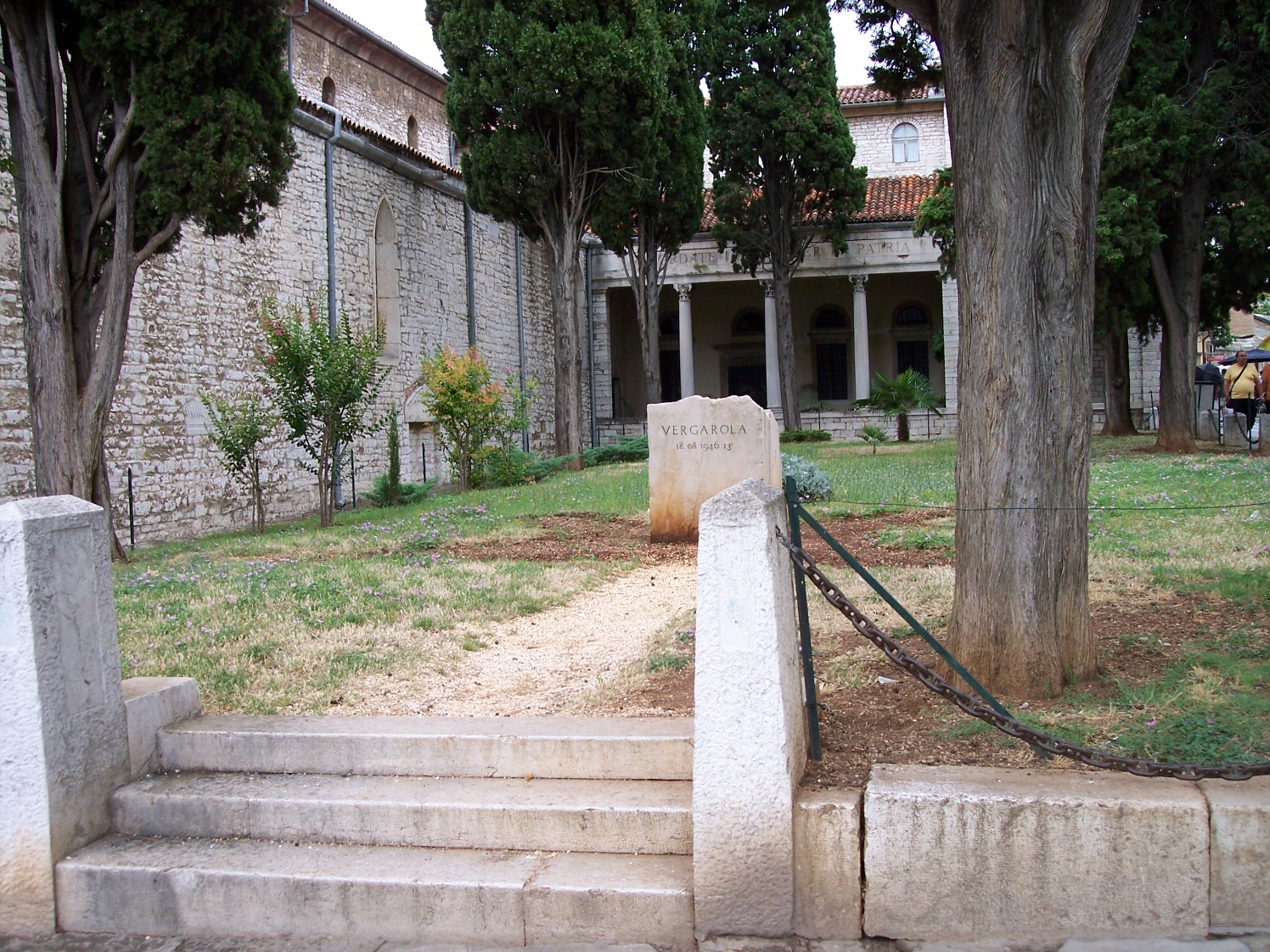
Memorial in Pula

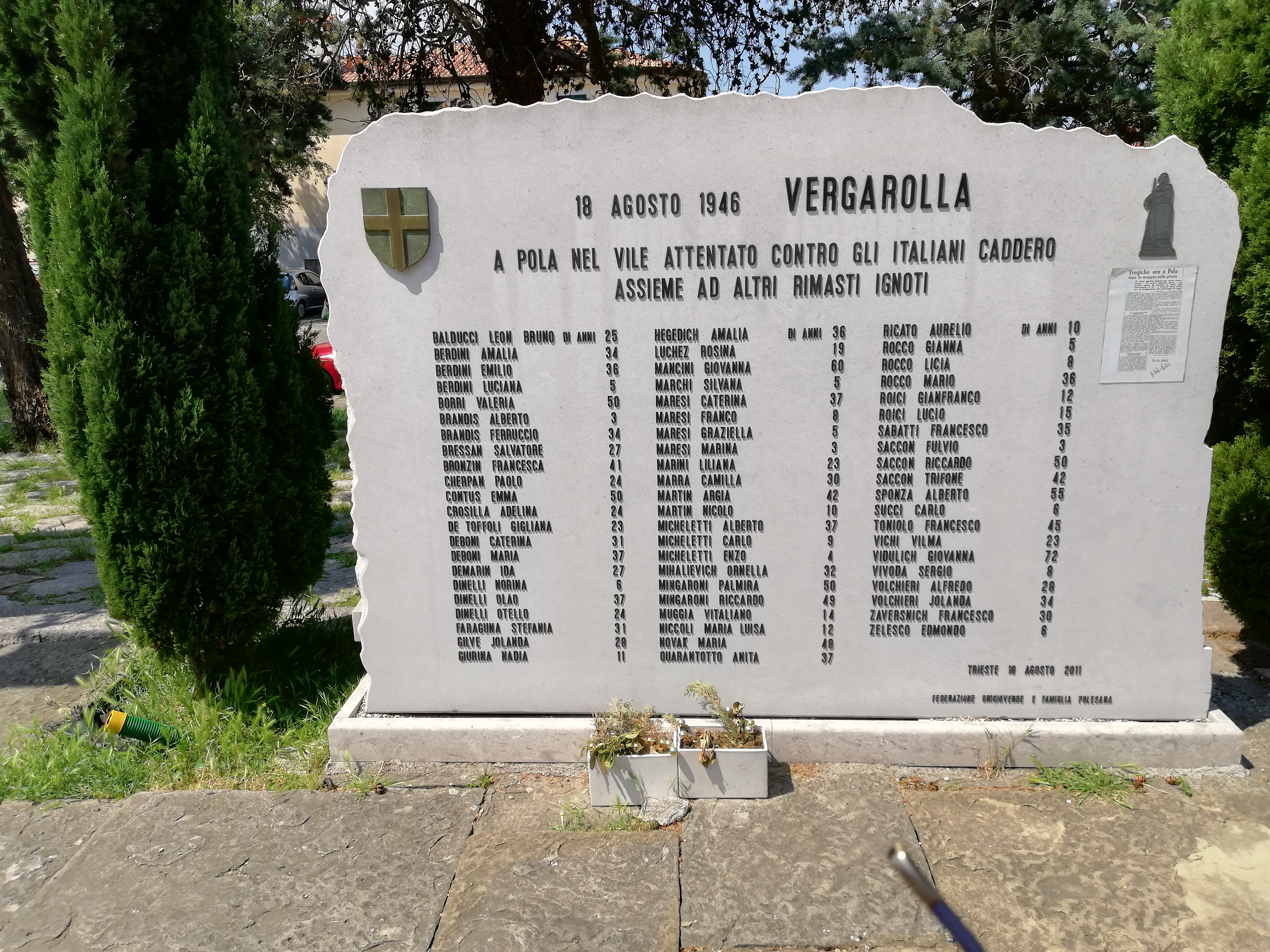
Monument in Trieste close by the Cathedral of San Giusto

The Vergarola explosion, also known in Italy as the Vergarolla massacre, took place on 18 August 1946 when the sudden detonation of 12 large pieces of assorted ordnance, containing an estimated 9 tons of explosives, killed more than 100 people and injured 100 others at Vergarola (or Vergarolla) beach, in Pula (Pola), which was at the time under temporary Allied military administration. The ordnance, which "had been swept from the water [and] were piled up on a beach awaiting disposal" exploded at just after 2pm, 18 August 1946. Initial newspaper reports cited 43 dead and 57 injured, including two British soldiers. Many of the victims were bathers who were attending an annual swimming event called Scarioni Cup. The explosion had strong political implications, because local Italian leaders and the main Italian newspaper L'Arena di Pola, suggested that it was a demonstration against the Italian feelings of the residents, and a way to reinforce the possible (later actual) annexation to the Socialist Federal Republic of Yugoslavia.

The exact number of victims of the incident remains undefined, with estimates ranging up to about a hundred dead.

== Allied investigation ==
A subsequent Allied military investigation into the incident was undertaken by Brigadier M.D. Erskine, commander of the 24th Guards Brigade who reported on 8 September 1946 that the accident was caused by the detonation of three torpedo warheads, four TNT demolition charges and five smoke generators. He said that the munitions had been inspected on several occasions and had been certified as being safe and that "I do not consider therefore that it is possible for it to have exploded without being detonated." He added that "[t]he ammunition was deliberately exploded by person or persons unknown. This is confirmed by the fact that a small preliminary explosion was heard and a fire was seen burning."

Agreeing with these findings, Brigadier Bastin on behalf of the General Officer Commanding in Chief concluded in the final report dated 14 February 1947 that "I am of the opinion that the explosion was caused by some person or persons unknown. I am satisfied that the ammunition was safe and properly inspected and that it was not feasible to place guards over it. I therefore consider that no blame for the explosion lies with the Allied Military Authorities."
