= Socialist Party of Italian Workers =

Socialist Party of Italian Workers (Italian: Partito Socialista dei Lavoratori Italiani, PSLI) is the name for a political party that has been used by three distinct organizations of the political left in Italy.

== Italian Socialist Party (1893–1895) ==
PSLI was the first name of the Italian Socialist Party (Italian: Partito Socialista Italiano, PSI) from 1893 to 1895.

== Unitary Socialist Party (1925–1927) ==
The most well known usage of PSLI was as the name of the Unitary Socialist Party (Italian: Partito Socialista Unitario, PSU) from 1925 to 1927.

== Italian Democratic Socialist Party (1947–1951) ==
PSLI was the name of the Italian Democratic Socialist Party (Italian: Partito Socialista Democratico Italiano, PSDI) from 1947 to 1951.

== See also ==
- Democratic Socialist Party
- Labour Party
- Social Democratic Party
- Socialist Party
- List of socialist parties
- Workers' Party
