= L'Arena di Pola =

Italian daily newspaper

- Front page of the 9 January 1993 issue
- Type: Daily newspaper
- Founded: 29 July 1945; 80 years ago
- Language: Italian
- Headquarters: Trieste, Italy

L'Arena di Pola (lit. '"Pola's Arena"') is an Italian newspaper founded in Pola (today Pula, Croatia), on 29 July 1945. Following the Yugoslav/ Croatian annexation of the city, the daily newspaper was moved first to Gorizia and then to Trieste. After it was moved to Gorizia, it became a periodical newspaper.

== History ==
It was born as a newspaper under the pressure of the National Liberation Committee of Pola (Comitato di Liberazione Nazionale di Pola) which had contacts with the Julian exiles in Italy and with the Italian National Liberation Committee. The newspaper opposed the passage of Pola to Yugoslavia. Antonio De Berti, who had collaborated with the newspaper from June to September 1925, encouraged the re-foundation of the newspaper in 1945. It was re-founded in Pola on 29 July 1945 by Attilio Craglietto.

On 14 May 1947, it stopped the publications in Pola and then restarted them as a periodical newspaper in Gorizia, and subsequently in Trieste. Currently the headquarters are in via Malaspina, in Trieste. From 1945 to 1947 the Arena di Pola was based in Pola in via Giulia, 1 (management and editorial staff) and in via Sergia, 51 (administration).

Since 1967 it has been the official organ of the Free Municipality of Pula in Exile (Libero Comune di Pola in Esilio).
