= Attilio Valobra =

Italian footballer (1892-1956)

Personal information
- Full name: Attilio Valobra
- Date of birth: 1892
- Place of birth: Turin, Italy
- Date of death: 1956 (aged 63–64)
- Position: Midfielder

Senior career*
Years	Team	Apps	(Gls)
1911–1914	Piemonte	?	(?)
1914–1924	Torino	46	(0)

International career
1913	Italy	1	(0)
- * Club domestic league appearances and goals

Attilio Valobra (Italian pronunciation: [atˈtiːljo vaˈlɔːbra]; 1892 – 1956) was an Italian footballer who played as a midfielder. On 15 June 1913, he represented the Italy national football team on the occasion of a friendly match against Austria in a 2–0 away loss.
