= Fort Munide =

Coordinates: 44°52′56″N 13°48′54″E

The remains of the fort today.

Fort Munide, also known as Fort Munida, is an Austro-Hungarian fortification located in the city of Pula, which is today in Croatia. The fort is located near the entrance to the Pula Bay on a promontory overlooking the passage.

== Construction ==
Fort Munide was built between 1852 and 1854, just as Pula was becoming a major naval base for the Austro-Hungarian empire. The fort is what is called a Maximilian Tower (an Austro-Hungarian variation of the British Martello tower), which was very popular between 1850 and 1875. The fort was made out of concrete and steel, both were building materials that would be used to create larger and more armored forts in the coming half century. From 1856 onward, the fort housed a plant for assembling artillery shells for the rest of the Pula fortifications.

== History ==
Fort Munide was renovated just before World War I, and housed infantry during 1914–15. Munide was abandoned after 1915, at this point the fort was nearly 70 years old. As the Second World War wrapped up, the fort was mostly destroyed in an Allied air raid. Over the years, people have removed the rubble for sale, as the building materials are still very valuable.
