= Fort Grosso (Pula) =

Austro-Hungarian fortification

Coordinates: 44.8865°N 13.8103°E

What remains of Fort Grosso isn't much more than ruins with a few parts of the structure still standing.

Fort Grosso is an Austro-Hungarian fortification located in the port city of Pula, Croatia. The fort was built between 1836 and 1845, a Martello tower was built between 1852-54, and the fort was renovated in 1859 and 1914. Grosso was built on top of the 67m high Monte Grosso, a short ways away from the town of Stinjan, a suburb of Pula. At one time the fort was quite imposing and was heavily armed with 18 guns. Most of the damage seen today is from bombardments from World War II, and after the war it was looted for stone to rebuild the local villages.
