= Krystal Joy Brown =

American actress

- Born: December 22, 1986 (age 39)
- Occupation: Actress
- Years active: 2005–present

Krystal Joy Brown is an American actress. She made her Broadway debut playing various roles in the musical revival of Hair (2009). She has since played Ornella Sturdevant in the musical Leap of Faith (2012), Josephine Bloom in Big Fish (2013), and Diana Ross in the jukebox musical Motown: The Musical (2014). She gained prominence and acclaim in a replacement role portraying Eliza Hamilton in the Lin-Manuel Miranda musical Hamilton, and as Gussie Carnegie in the Stephen Sondheim revival Merrily We Roll Along (2022–2024).

Brown is also known for her roles on television including Renee Timmons on the Starz series, Power Book III: Raising Kanan (2022). She also took recurring roles voicing Netossa in the Netflix animated series She-Ra and the Princesses of Power (2018–2020). She starred in the 2023 Hallmark Christmas film Heaven Down Here and plays Barbara Gordon in the Amazon Prime animated series Batman: Caped Crusader (2024–present).

== Career ==
=== 2007–2010: Acting roles and Broadway debut ===
Brown made her acting debut in the national tour of the hit Broadway musical Rent (2007), where she was cast as Mimi. Brown's theatrical productions outside of Broadway include the regional productions of Little Shop of Horrors (2008), High School Musical (2008) and Calvin Berger (2010). She also appeared in the Off-Broadway show Falling for Eve (2010). Brown made her Broadway debut as a replacement for various characters in the musical revival Hair (2009).

=== 2011–2018: Continued Broadway roles ===
She originated the role of Ornella Sturdevant on stage in the Broadway musical Leap of Faith (2012), an adaptation of the 1992 film comedy of the same name starring Steve Martin. David Rooney of The Hollywood Reporter wrote, "Brown bring powerhouse pipes and get to test them often". The following year she originated the role of Josephine Bloom in the Broadway musical Big Fish (2013), an adaptation of the 2004 film of the same name. Theatre critic Elizabeth Vincentelli of The New York Post opined that "Sadly...Krystal Joy Brown [is] given little to do beside stand steadfastly by [her] spouse". On January 24, 2014, Brown returned to Broadway taking over the role of Diana Ross for Valisia LeKae in the Broadway jukebox musical Motown: The Musical.

During this time Brown made her first television appearance in the series Castle, as a character named Sasha, in the 2011 episode titled "Pretty Dead". During this time Brown has taken roles on television acting in guest parts on the Hulu original TV series Deadbeat (2016) for the episode "Abracadaver" and in the NBC legal series Law & Order: Special Victims Unit (2016). Brown was the voice of Netossa in animated Netflix series She-Ra and the Princesses of Power from 2018 to 2020.

=== 2019–present: Breakthrough and acclaim ===
In 2019, Brown guest starred in the Sydney to the Max episode "How the Syd Stole Christmas" portraying Sydney Reynolds' late mother Dr. Alisha Reynolds in a flashback to four years ago. In 2020–2022, Brown began a recurring role in the CBS series The Equalizer (2021) opposite Queen Latifah. Brown recurs on season two of Power Book III: Raising Kanan (2022). On December 10, 2019, she joined the cast of Lin-Manuel Miranda's Broadway musical Hamilton portraying Eliza Hamilton. Kyle Smith of National Review praised her performance writing, "The Schuyler sisters provide the most beautiful voices in the production, with Krystal Joy Brown offering a poignant Eliza".

In 2022, she played Gussie Carnegie, a Broadway diva married to self-centered writer Frank Shepard, played by Jonathan Groff in the off-Broadway revival of the Stephen Sondheim musical Merrily We Roll Along at the New York Theatre Workshop. For her performance she was nominated for a Lucille Lortel Award for Best Featured Actress in a Musical. She reprised the role on Broadway in 2023. Jesse Green of The New York Times described Brown as giving a "fetching performance, charming if not credible". She said of the role, "This opportunity to represent and be the first Black Gussie is huge and it feels powerful". To get into Gussie’s character, she was inspired by Eartha Kitt, Diahann Carroll, Dorothy Dandridge and Diana Ross.

Brown provides the voice of Barbara Gordon in the animated series Batman: Caped Crusader.

== Filmography ==
=== Film ===
Year	Title	Role	Notes
2017	Victor Crowley	Sabrina	
2020	Magic Camp	Lena Lambert	
2025	Merrily We Roll Along	Gussie Carnegie	Filmed production

=== Television ===
Year	Title	Role	Notes
2011	Castle	Sasha	Episode: "Pretty Dead"
2016	Deadbeat	Minnie	Episode: "Abracadaver"
2016	Law & Order: Special Victims Unit	Charise McCabe	Episode: "Intersecting Lives"
2018–2020	She-Ra and the Princesses of Power	Netossa (voice)	8 episodes
2019	Sydney to the Max	Dr. Alisha Reynolds	Episode: "How the Syd Stole Christmas"
2020	One Royal Holiday	Sara	TV movie
2021	Final Space	Avery Ergon (voice)	Episode: "All the Moments Lost"
2021	The Equalizer	Kelly	2 episodes
2021	Writing Around The Christmas Tree	Mikeala	TV movie
2022	Power Book III: Raising Kanan	Renée Timmons	Recurring cast: season 2
2024	Batman: Caped Crusader	Barbara Gordon (voice)	Recurring role; 6 episodes

=== Theatre ===
Year	Title	Role	Notes
2007	Rent	Mimi	National Tour
2008	Little Shop of Horrors	Crystal	Regional
2008	High School Musical	Taylor McKessie	Regional
2009–2010	Hair	Ensemble u/s Dionne	Broadway
2010	Calvin Berger	Rosanna	Regional
2010	Falling for Eve	Eve	Off-Broadway
2012	Leap of Faith	Ornella Sturdevant	Broadway
2013	Big Fish	Josephine Bloom	Broadway
2014–2015	Motown: The Musical	Diana Ross	Broadway
2018	Sweet Charity	Helene	Freud Playhouse
2019–2022	Hamilton	Elizabeth Schuyler Hamilton	Broadway
2022–2023	Merrily We Roll Along	Gussie Carnegie	Off-Broadway
2023–2024	Merrily We Roll Along	Gussie Carnegie	Broadway
2026	Play On!	Lady Liv	Chicago Shakeseare Theater

== Awards and nominations ==
Year	Association	Category	Project	Result	Ref.
2012	Astaire Award	Outstanding Female Dancer in a Broadway Show	Leap of Faith	Nominated	
2014	Astaire Award	Outstanding Female Dancer in a Broadway Show	Big Fish	Nominated	
2023	Lucille Lortel Award	Outstanding Featured Actress in a Musical	Merrily We Roll Along	Nominated	
