= Big Fish (musical) =

2013 Broadway musical

- Original Broadway Playbill
- Music: Andrew Lippa
- Lyrics: Andrew Lippa
- Book: John August
- Basis: Big Fish by John August; Big Fish: A Novel of Mythic Proportions Daniel Wallace
- Productions: 2013 Chicago tryout 2013 Broadway; 2017 Off-West End

Big Fish is a musical with music and lyrics by Andrew Lippa and book by John August. It is based on Daniel Wallace's 1998 novel, Big Fish: A Novel of Mythic Proportions, and the 2003 film Big Fish written by John August and directed by Tim Burton.

Big Fish revolves around the relationship between Edward Bloom, a traveling salesman, and his adult son Will. The story shifts between two timelines. In the present-day real world, sixty-year-old Edward Bloom faces his mortality while his son, Will, prepares to become a father himself. In the storybook past, Edward ages from a teenager, encountering a Witch, a Giant, a Mermaid, and the love of his life, Sandra. The stories meet as Will discovers the secret his father never revealed.

== Plot ==
Act 1

In Alabama, Edward Bloom and his son, Will, discuss Will's impending wedding. Entering a flashback to when Will was a child, Edward tells him a story. Edward is walking down the river when he meets a man trying to catch fish to no avail. So Edward teaches him the proper way to catch fish ("Be the Hero"). When he finishes his story, Edward's wife, Sandra, tells them it's time for Will to go to bed. Edward refuses behind her back and tells Will another story of a witch that Edward met as a teenager ("The Witch").

The story returns to the present day, where Edward suspects that Will's fiancée, Josephine, is pregnant. He reveals this at the wedding, angering Will and as Josephine takes the shocked crowd to catch the bouquet, Will and Edward argue. After the reception, Edward's doctor notices that Edward seems to be in pain and suggests that he come in for an examination. Edward and Sandra discover that the cancer Edward has been fighting has spread beyond where they had thought. Will and Josephine discover that their child is a boy ("Take Another Look"). Later that day, Will promises to strengthen his relationship with his father, who he sees as a "Stranger".

Sandra tells Will that although he and Edward can be a handful, she loves them both ("Two Men in My Life"). Edward tells her another story about how he was the hero of his small town, Ashton, and was the boyfriend of the head cheerleader, Jenny Hill ("Ashton's Favorite Son").

The town of Ashton, Alabama, is scared by a giant living in a nearby cave, so Edward volunteers to go talk to him. He introduces himself to the giant, named Karl, and convinces him to join him on a journey away from Ashton ("Out There on the Road").

Back in the present, Josephine finds a deed to a house in Ashton signed by Jenny Hill and Edward. She thinks this proves that Edward must be telling the truth, but Will denies it. However, Josephine's interest sparks a conversation of Edward and Sandra's meeting. While Will believes they met in college, Josephine explains that is not what Edward told her. Will asks which version of the story she was told, and there is another flashback.

Edward has taken Karl to try out for a circus. When they get there, three girls are auditioning with their song and dance routine ("Little Lamb from Alabama"). Edward notices one of the girls, Sandra, and it is love at first sight ("Time Stops"). He convinces the ringmaster, Amos Calloway, to hire Karl, and then agrees to work for the circus for free in exchange for one clue about Sandra each month ("Closer to Her"). After three years of working at the circus, Edward finds Amos in his true form: a werewolf. Upon learning Amos' big secret, Edward finally convinces him to tell him what he wants to know: Her name is Sandra Templeton, she goes to Auburn University, and she loves daffodils.

Edward finds Sandra only to discover that she is engaged to Don Price, Edward's high school rival. When Don sees Edward talking to Sandra, he beats him to the ground. Undaunted, Edward proposes to Sandra, and promises her a life full of "Daffodils".

Act 2

The show continues as Edward leads young Will and some other boys in a boy scouts troop to make a bonfire. He tells them the story of when he was in the war ("Red, White, and True"). Edward tells Sandra and Will he has to travel for a while for his work as a traveling salesman. Will is upset, but Edward tells him he must be brave and "Fight the Dragons".

In the present, Will prepares to confront Edward about the deed he and Josephine found ("Stranger" (Reprise)). Edward is lying in bed when Will comes in and asks about the Ashton deed, but Edward grows angry and yells at him to get out. He falls into an uneasy sleep and has a dream that he and Will have a Western-style duel and trial over the issue ("The Showdown"). He wakes up screaming, and as Sandra comforts him, it begins to rain. Edward says the roof should hold up for another ten years after he's gone, and Sandra tells him "I Don't Need a Roof".

Will goes to visit Jenny Hill in Ashton to find the truth. Jenny tells him the story of what happened when Edward returned to Ashton when Will was just a small boy. In this flashback, Edward returns to Ashton to learn that the town is going to be flooded, and he finds that the citizens and the mayor refuse to leave. Edward provides the citizens with a new town ("Start Over"). He leaves Jenny with another broken heart, never to return again ("Start Over" (Reprise)). At the end of Jenny's story, Will receives a phone call and must go visit his father in the hospital.

When Will arrives to the hospital, he discovers Edward is dying. Edward asks Will to tell him the story of how he dies. Will makes up his own story of Edward escaping the "prison cell" ("What's Next"). At the river, Sandra appears and they embrace one last time. They lead him back to his hospital bed as they disappear one by one, leaving Edward alone with Will. Edward's life has come to an end ("How It Ends").

A few years later, Will and his son return to the river as he begins to tell him stories, just as Edward did to him ("Be the Hero" (Reprise)).

== Productions ==
- Big Fish opened in an out-of-town tryout at Chicago's Oriental Theatre, running from April 2 to May 5, 2013, directed and choreographed by Susan Stroman. The cast featured Norbert Leo Butz as Edward Bloom, Kate Baldwin as Sandra Bloom, Bobby Steggert as Will Bloom, Krystal Joy Brown as Josephine, Brad Oscar as Amos Calloway, and Ryan Andes as Karl, with scenic design by Julian Crouch, costume design by William Ivey Long, lighting by Donald Holder, music direction by Mary-Mitchell Campbell, and orchestrations by Larry Hochman. The musical was produced by Dan Jinks and Bruce Cohen in association with Stage Entertainment.
- The musical premiered on Broadway at the Neil Simon Theatre on September 5, 2013, in previews, and opened on October 6, 2013. The musical closed on December 29, 2013, after 34 previews and 98 regular performances.
- The first regional production of Big Fish was presented by Jedlicka Performing Arts Center in Cicero, Illinois and ran from July 29 through August 10, 2014. The second regional production was presented by Musical Theatre West at the Carpenter Performing Arts Center in Long Beach, California (October 31 - November 16, 2014). This first production "west of the Mississippi" used sets (partial), costumes, and multi-media from the original Broadway production, purchased by MTW after the show closed at the end of 2013, and was directed by Larry Carpenter, choreographed by Peggy Hickey, and conducted by Matthew Smedal. Jeff Skowron led the cast as Edward Bloom. The 12-chair (12-person cast) version of Big Fish, licensed by Theatrical Rights Worldwide, was presented by Front Porch Theatricals in Pittsburgh, Pennsylvania, for a sold-out seven-show run from August 18–27, 2017, at the New Hazlett Theater. This regional professional premiere starred Billy Hartung as Edward Bloom and Kristiann Menotiades as Sandra Bloom, and was directed by Spencer Whale, choreographed by Mara Newbery Greer, and music directed by Melissa Yanchak.
- The German premiere took place in Munich's Prinzregententheater on November 10, 2016. Directed by Andreas Gergen and choreographed by Danny Costello, the show starred the undergraduates and graduates of the "August Everding" theatre academy.
- The Australian premiere opened at the Hayes Theatre on April 2, 2017, starring Phillip Lowe as Edward Bloom, Katrina Retallick as Sandra Bloom, and Adam Rennie as Will Bloom. The production was the 12 Chair version, produced by RPG Productions and directed by Tyran Parke.

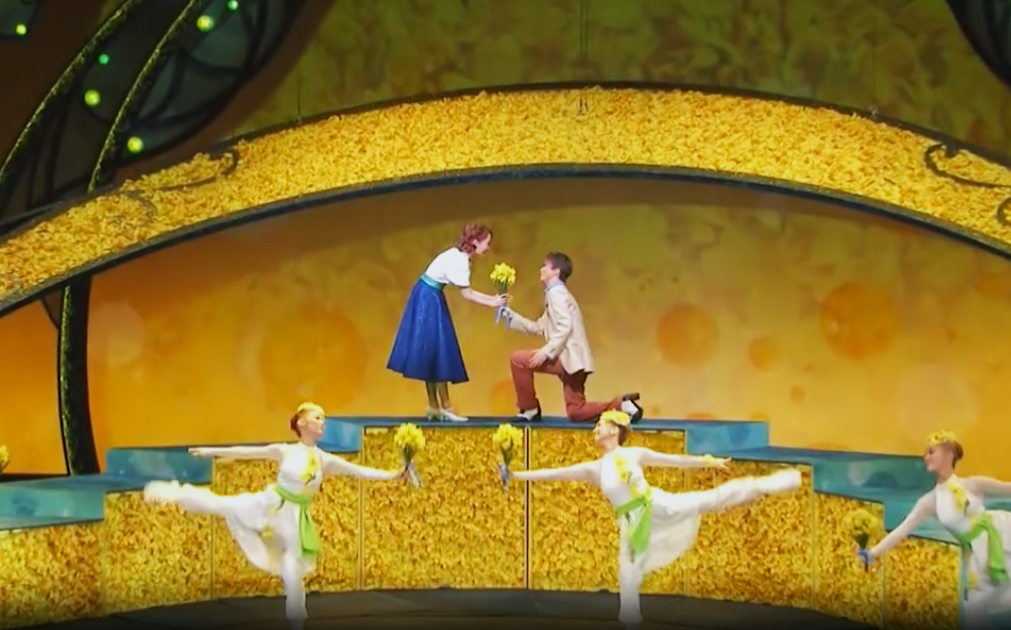
"Daffodils" with Makoto Rei (Edward) and Chizuru Uta (young Sandra) at Tokyu Theatre Orb, Tokyo, Japan (2024)

- The United Kingdom premiere took place in London’s Off-West End, from November to December 2017 at The Other Palace, starring Kelsey Grammer (Edward), Clare Burt (Sandra), Jamie Muscato (Young Edward), and Matthew Seadon-Young (Will), with direction by Nigel Harman.
- The Scottish premiere took place in Glasgow, from January 17–19, 2019. It was produced by Epilogue Theatre in partnership with the Village Storytelling Charity, and was directed by Luke Seawright and starred Pete Robson as Edward Bloom, Rachel Hunter as Sandra Bloom, and Michael Pellman as Will Bloom.
- The Swedish premiere took place at Uppsala Teater on March 13, 2019. The Norwegian premiere will be at Sandvika Teater in October 2022.
- The Korean premiere was held at the CJ Towol Theater in the Seoul Arts Center from December 4, 2019 to February 9, 2020. Directed by Scott Schwartz and Kim Jeong-han with arrangement director Seongsu Kim and choreographer Hong Yoo-seon.
- The Belgian premiere took place in Bruges in September 2022. They performed the West End version of the musical.
- The Japanese production by all-female theatre troupe Takarazuka Revue took place in Tokyu Theatre Orb from May 30 through June 16, 2024. It was directed by Daichi Inaba, starring Star Troupe's Makoto Rei as Edward, Shin Kiwami as Will and Honoka Kozakura as Sandra. On June 7, Andrew Lippa went to see the show and commented on the production.

== Musical numbers ==
Sources: PlaybillVault; Internet Broadway database

* – Denotes song not included on the Original Broadway Cast Recording

† - These three songs are all included under “The Witch” on the Original Broadway Cast Recording

Act I

- "Be the Hero" – Edward Bloom and Company
- “The Witch (I Know What You Want) – The Witch, Edward Bloom, Company †
- “Edward’s Vision” – The Witch, Edward Bloom, Young Will Bloom †
- “The Witch” (Reprise) – The Witch, Edward Bloom, Company †
- “Just Take Another Look” - Josephine Bloom, Will Bloom *
- "Stranger" – Will Bloom
- "Two Men In My Life" – Sandra Bloom
- "Ashton's Favorite Son" – Company
- "Out There on the Road" – Edward Bloom, Karl, Jenny Hill and Company
- "Little Lamb from Alabama" – Sandra Templeton and Alabama Lambs
- "Time Stops" – Edward Bloom and Sandra Templeton
- "Closer to Her" – Amos Calloway, Edward Bloom and Company
- "Daffodils" – Edward Bloom and Sandra Templeton (Bloom)

Act II

- "Red, White and True" – Sandra Bloom, Edward Bloom, Red Fang, and Company
- "Fight the Dragons" – Edward Bloom and Young Will Bloom
- "Stranger" (Reprise) – Will Bloom *
- “Showdown” – Will Bloom, Edward Bloom, Company
- "I Don't Need a Roof" – Sandra Bloom
- "Start Over" – Edward Bloom, Don Price, Amos Calloway, Karl, Zacky Price and Company
- "Start Over" (Reprise) – Edward Bloom, Jenny Hill *
- "What's Next" – Will Bloom, Edward Bloom and Company
- "How It Ends" – Edward Bloom
- "Be the Hero" (Reprise) – Will Bloom

Cut Songs

Two bonus tracks were added on the cast recording. These songs were initially in the show, but were later cut for various reasons. They have both been reinstated in the Big Fish: High School Edition.

- "This River Between Us" – Edward Bloom and Will Bloom (in place of "Showdown”)
- "Magic in the Man" – Sandra Bloom (in place of "Two Men In My Life")

== Cast and characters ==
Character	Chicago tryout (2013)	Broadway (2013)	Tokyo (2017)	Sydney (2017)	London (2017)	Seoul (2019)
Edward Bloom	Norbert Leo Butz	Norbert Leo Butz	Jay Kabira	Phillip Lowe	Kelsey Grammer (old) Jamie Muscato (young)	Nam Kyung-ju; Park Ho-san; Son Jun-ho
Will Bloom	Bobby Steggert	Bobby Steggert	Kenji Urai	Adam Rennie	Matthew Seadon-Young	Lee Chang-yong; Kim Sung-cheol
Sandra Bloom (Templeton)	Kate Baldwin	Kate Baldwin	Hiromu Kiriya	Katrina Retallick	Clare Burt (old) Laura Baldwin (young)	Gu Won-young; Kim Ji-woo
Young Will	Zachary Unger; Anthony Pierni	Zachary Unger; Anthony Pierni	Fuku Suzuki; Ryota	Sam Wood; Brendan Godwin		
Josephine Bloom	Krystal Joy Brown	Krystal Joy Brown	Nene Yumesaki	Alessandra Merlo	Frances McNamee	Kim Hwan-hee
Karl	Ryan Andes	Ryan Andes	Motoki Fukami	Seth Drury	Dean Nolan	Lee Deun
Amos Calloway	Brad Oscar	Brad Oscar	Rolly Teranishi	Brenden Lovett	Forbes Masson	Kim Tae-hyun
Don Price	Ben Crawford	Ben Crawford	Takashi Fujii	Aaron Tsindos	Forbes Masson	Hwang I-geon
The Witch	Katie Thompson	Ciara Renée	JKim	Brittanie Shipway	Landi Oshinowo	Ju-a
Jenny Hill	Kirsten Scott	Kirsten Scott	Ranran Suzuki	Kirby Burgess	Landi Oshinowo	Na Ha-na
Zacky Price	Alex Brightman	Alex Brightman	Mitsuaki Higashiyama	Joel Granger	George Ure	Kim Seong-su

== Instrumentation ==
Big Fish was orchestrated by Larry Hochman, with additional orchestrations by Bruce Coughlin, for a fourteen-piece orchestra. The instrumentation calls for two keyboards, two guitars, bass/bass guitar, drums, percussion, two woodwind players (Reed 1: piccolo, flute, alto flute, oboe, English horn, clarinet, soprano sax, alto sax, tenor sax; Reed 2: flute, clarinet, bass clarinet, tenor sax, baritone sax, bassoon), trumpet, French horn, violin, viola, and cello. This orchestration was used on Broadway, conducted by Mary-Mitchell Campbell and will be licensed with the show. Additional string players were added for the cast recording.

== Awards and nominations ==
Year	Award	Category	Nominee	Result
2014	Drama Desk Award	Outstanding Featured Actor in a Musical	Bobby Steggert	Nominated
2014	Drama Desk Award	Outstanding Music	Andrew Lippa	Nominated
2014	Drama Desk Award	Outstanding Orchestrations	Larry Hochman	Nominated
2015	Jimmy Award	Best Performance by an Actor (as Edward Bloom)	Drayton Maclean Mayers	Nominated
2018	Jimmy Award	Best Performance by an Actress (as Sandra Bloom)	Reneé Rapp	Won
2019	Jimmy Award	Best Performance by an Actor (as Will Bloom)	Ethan Kelso	Won
2025	Jimmy Award	Best Performance by an Actress (as Sandra Bloom)	Fabiola Caraballo Quijada	Won

== Critical response ==
Out-of-town reviews for Big Fish were positive. Variety called it "a wholly satisfying show: meaningful, emotional, tasteful, theatrically imaginative and engaging," and concluded:

[B]y taking Edward's tales as the jumping-off point for the theatricality of production numbers, the show makes a case for the musical form itself as a means of privileging imagination over ordinariness. The show does have a target audience after all, and it's those who love musicals.

Chris Jones of the Chicago Tribune wrote:

[I]n the best moments, you feel like you're watching something deep and powerful, sourced by a work of fine literature, propelled into awareness by a potent film and, most crucially of all, a story that makes us feel we can control, if not transcend, the story of the end of our lives.

Reviews were mixed once the show moved to Broadway. Upon seeing the show again after its move to New York, Jones commented on the changes:

This final Broadway version of "Big Fish" has changed considerably, and improved in leaps and bounds, from the version audiences saw in Chicago, especially in the radically different first act. . . . With the indefatigable, deeply engaged and seemingly irreplaceable Norbert Leo Butz driving its storytelling and willing the show's crucial emotional subtext into being by sheer force of talent and will, "Big Fish" arrives on Broadway as an earnest, family-friendly, heart-warming and mostly successful new American musical

Despite the quality production values, Joe Dziemianowicz of the New York Daily News felt that Susan Stroman's dances were pedestrian, writing: " 'Big Fish' is a singing version of catch-and-release. It hooks you, then loses you — all night."

Ben Brantley of The New York Times wrote:

Here, though, [Director Susan Stroman] seems to be drawing almost randomly from her bottomless bag of tricks. Yes, her use of dancers to embody an enchanted forest and a campfire is delightful. And it's hard not to chuckle when those two-stepping elephants make a cameo appearance. But if the show is all about the need for personal myths, it has to let its leading mythmaker take charge.

Elysa Gardner of USA Today agreed:

Somehow, though, the effect isn't as dazzling, or as moving, as you would hope -- particularly given the talented players involved in this production […] In the end, though, this Big Fish lacks the imagination or cohesion to reel you in like one of its hero's yarns.

Thom Geler of Entertainment Weekly had a more positive take on those same aspects:

It's no spoiler to say that imagination wins out, particularly in director-choreographer Susan Stroman's visually lavish production, which boasts dancing circus elephants, a mermaid who pops up from the orchestra pit, and tree trunks that ingeniously morph into a coven of witches. Don Holder's lighting, William Ivey Long's costumes, and Benjamin Pearcy's projections are often wondrous to behold . . . For the most part, though, Big Fish finds theatrically inventive ways to reel audiences into its central love story. In this case, it isn't boy-meets-girl but father-hooks-son. And Edward Bloom is quite a catch.

Michael Dale of BroadwayWorld.com praised its "clean humor:"

Wholesomeness gets a bad rap on Broadway these days, usually regarded as the kind of unbearably sweet and inoffensive entertainment that sophisticated theatergoers must endure while taking their conservative grandmas out for a night on the town. […] But Big Fish, the new musical that tattoos its heart on its arm, displays no fear in plopping its unabashed wholesomeness right in your lap. Its spirit is steeped in Rodgers and Hammerstein decency that propels an evening that's adventurous, romantic and, yeah, kinda hip.

Butz's performance, however, has been almost universally praised. Jeremy Gerard of Bloomberg wrote:

The part is custom made for Norbert Leo Butz, who hasn't had such a meaty role since 'Dirty Rotten Scoundrels.' His ingratiating singing and dancing bespeak the rare man comfortable in his own skin, and he has that indefinable charismatic spark that defines a star.

Variety reviewer Marilyn Stasio wrote: "Norbert Leo Butz is cutting loose in another one of his don't-dare-miss-this perfs in 'Big Fish,' a show that speaks to anyone pining for a studiously heart-warming musical about the efforts of a dying man to justify a lifetime of lousy parenting to his alienated son."
