= Millbrook, Alabama =

City in Alabama, United States

- City
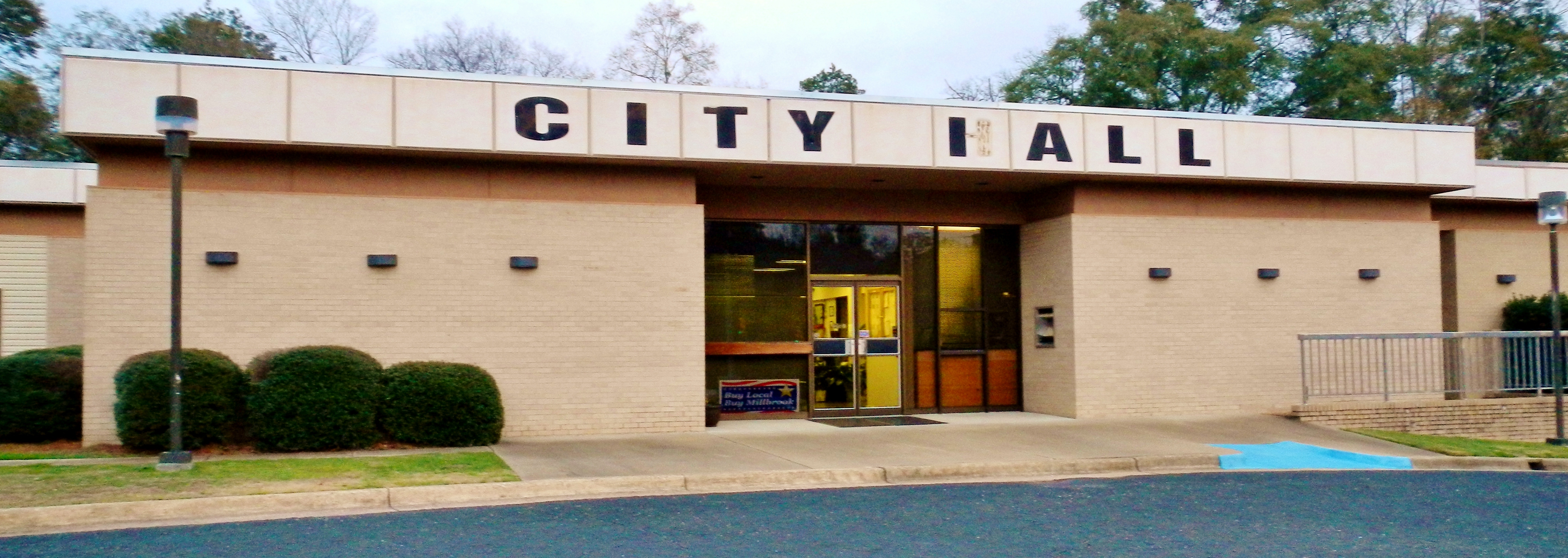
- Millbrook City Hall

- Seal Logo
- Motto(s): "Comfort, Convenience, Community"
- Location of Millbrook in Autauga County and Elmore County, Alabama.
- Coordinates: 32°29′51″N 86°22′27″W
- Country: United States
- State: Alabama
- Counties: Autauga, Elmore
- Established: 1979

Government
  - Type: Mayor–council

Area
  - Total: 14.51 sq mi (37.58 km^{2})
  - Land: 14.21 sq mi (36.80 km^{2})
  - Water: 0.30 sq mi (0.78 km^{2})
- Elevation: 253 ft (77 m)

Population (2020)
  - Total: 16,564
  - Density: 1,165.8/sq mi (450.11/km^{2})
- Time zone: UTC-6 (Central (CST))
  - Summer (DST): UTC-5 (CDT)
- ZIP code: 36054
- Area code: 334
- FIPS code: 01-48712
- GNIS feature ID: 2404261
- Website: cityofmillbrook.org

Millbrook is a city in Elmore and Autauga counties in the U.S. state of Alabama. The population was 16,564 at the 2020 census, up from 14,640 in 2010. It is part of the Montgomery Metropolitan Statistical Area.

== Geography ==
According to the United States Census Bureau, the city has a total area of 13.1 square miles (34 km^{2}), of which 12.8 square miles (33 km^{2}) is land and 0.3 square miles (0.78 km^{2}) (1.75%) is water.

=== Climate ===
According to the Köppen climate classification, Millbrook has a humid subtropical climate (abbreviated Cfa).

Climate data for Millbrook, 1991–2020 simulated normals (174 ft elevation)
Month	Jan	Feb	Mar	Apr	May	Jun	Jul	Aug	Sep	Oct	Nov	Dec	Year
Mean daily maximum °F (°C)	57.9 (14.4)	62.4 (16.9)	70.0 (21.1)	77.0 (25.0)	84.4 (29.1)	89.8 (32.1)	91.9 (33.3)	91.8 (33.2)	87.6 (30.9)	78.4 (25.8)	68.0 (20.0)	60.1 (15.6)	76.6 (24.8)
Daily mean °F (°C)	47.1 (8.4)	51.3 (10.7)	58.3 (14.6)	64.9 (18.3)	73.0 (22.8)	79.7 (26.5)	82.2 (27.9)	81.7 (27.6)	77.2 (25.1)	66.7 (19.3)	55.9 (13.3)	49.5 (9.7)	65.6 (18.7)
Mean daily minimum °F (°C)	36.5 (2.5)	39.9 (4.4)	46.4 (8.0)	53.1 (11.7)	61.9 (16.6)	69.6 (20.9)	72.3 (22.4)	71.8 (22.1)	66.6 (19.2)	55.0 (12.8)	43.9 (6.6)	38.8 (3.8)	54.7 (12.6)
Average precipitation inches (mm)	5.12 (130.13)	5.31 (134.82)	5.37 (136.39)	4.42 (112.30)	3.98 (101.08)	4.89 (124.23)	4.93 (125.24)	4.35 (110.50)	3.62 (91.94)	3.10 (78.74)	4.03 (102.47)	5.29 (134.42)	54.41 (1,382.26)
Average dew point °F (°C)	37.8 (3.2)	40.6 (4.8)	45.9 (7.7)	52.9 (11.6)	61.3 (16.3)	68.4 (20.2)	71.4 (21.9)	70.9 (21.6)	66.0 (18.9)	56.1 (13.4)	46.0 (7.8)	41.0 (5.0)	54.9 (12.7)
Source: PRISM Climate Group

== History ==
Millbrook includes the former village of Robinson Springs within its boundaries. Numerous eras delineate Millbrook's past.

The area's first permanent home "Ellerslie" was completed in 1818 by Georgia Congressman, and Revolutionary War Veteran Bolling Hall. The area's second permanent home "Thornfield" was started the following year, and completed in 1820 by pioneer Archibald McKeithen. Both homes still stand, and are private residences.

After its initial settlement, Robinson Springs was known as an early summer resort for wealthy families of Montgomery, and the vicinity. The Robinson Springs United Methodist Church was formed in 1828. The settlers quickly grew out of the log structure, and decided to build a permanent structure. The present church was completed in 1848. The parsonage was sold soon after completion (due to the lack of a steady minister) to noted Alabama historian Albert J. Pickett. It still stands two doors down from the church. In 1852, Robinson Springs played host to Alabama's first state fair.

Shadrack Mims, Autauga's early historian, describes Robinson Springs (circa 1850) as "a spot selected by Todd Robinson as a retreat from the river; and much good sense did he show in such selection - for, if the whole South was searched over, a more healthy spot, in my opinion, could not be found. It is altogether rural in its appearance, the forest growth being untouched, only for garden spots. As to water, it cannot be excelled any where for coolness, clearness, and pleasantness, and the abundance of it. The building situations are beautiful. Upon the whole, it is just the place for a summer retreat; just the place for a school - healthy and high, and free from the temptations so common in villages and cities."

1861 saw many of the area's youth go off to fight in the Civil War. In June 1862, Private Bolling Hall III, on leave from fighting in Virginia, mustered a company of men under a tree at the current site of the confederate monument. They elected him captain, and the company a part of Hilliards Legion. Remnants were later morphed into the 59th Alabama Infantry, with Colonel Bolling Hall III commanding. No remarkable events took place here during the war.

During the post-World War I and pre-World War II period, the communities of Millbrook, Coosada, and Robinson Springs, later referred to as the Tri-Community, began to evolve into populated growing communities, complete with schools, churches, and rail transportation.

As in the 1930s, much of today's progress is linked to transportation. With the introduction of Interstate 65 in the mid 1970s, Millbrook's growth led to formal incorporation as a city in 1977.

== Demographics ==
Historical population
Census	Pop.	Note	%±
1970	2,382		—
1980	3,101		30.2%
1990	6,050		95.1%
2000	10,386		71.7%
2010	14,640		41.0%
2020	16,564		13.1%
2025 (est.)	17,623	▲	6.4%
U.S. Decennial Census

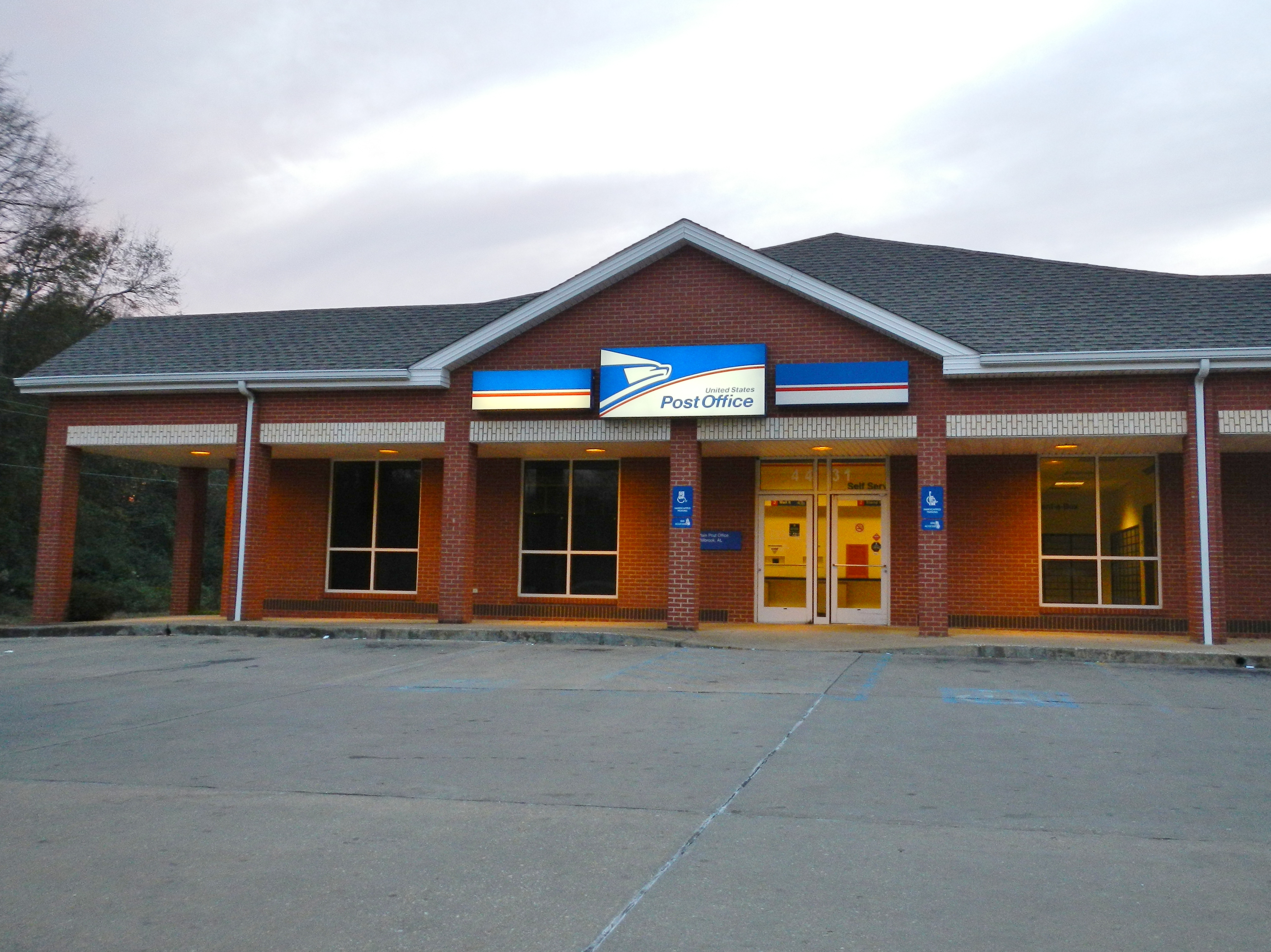
Millbrook Post Office (ZIP code: 36054)

=== 2020 census ===
Millbrook racial composition
Race	Num.	Perc.
White (non-Hispanic)	10,702	64.61%
Black or African American (non-Hispanic)	4,354	26.29%
Native American	49	0.3%
Asian	184	1.11%
Pacific Islander	2	0.01%
Other/Mixed	750	4.53%
Hispanic or Latino	523	3.16%

As of the 2020 census, Millbrook had a population of 16,564. The median age was 38.0 years. 23.9% of residents were under the age of 18 and 14.9% of residents were 65 years of age or older. For every 100 females there were 89.3 males, and for every 100 females age 18 and over there were 84.9 males age 18 and over.

88.0% of residents lived in urban areas, while 12.0% lived in rural areas.

There were 6,556 households in Millbrook, including 4,226 family households. Of all households, 33.3% had children under the age of 18 living in them, 47.9% were married-couple households, 16.1% were households with a male householder and no spouse or partner present, and 30.9% were households with a female householder and no spouse or partner present. About 26.2% of all households were made up of individuals and 9.4% had someone living alone who was 65 years of age or older.

There were 6,858 housing units, of which 4.4% were vacant. The homeowner vacancy rate was 1.3% and the rental vacancy rate was 5.2%.

=== 2010 census ===
As of the census of 2010, there were 14,640 people, 5,446 households, and 4,069 families residing in the city. The population density was 1,142.9 inhabitants per square mile (441.3/km^{2}). There were 5,996 housing units at an average density of 468.1 per square mile (180.7/km^{2}). The racial makeup of the city was 74.2% White, 21.6% Black or African American, 0.4% Native American, 0.8% Asian, 0.05% Pacific Islander, 1.0% from other races, and 2.0% from two or more races. 2.8% of the population were Hispanic or Latino of any race.

There were 5,446 households, out of which 37.8% had children under the age of 18 living with them, 55.3% were married couples living together, 4.6% had a male householder with no wife present, 14.8% had a female householder with no husband present, and 25.3% were non-families. 21.3% of all households were made up of individuals, and 6.1% had someone living alone who was 65 years of age or older. The average household size was 2.69 and the average family size was 3.12.

In the city, the population was spread out, with 27.8% under the age of 18, 9.0% from 18 to 24, 29.1% from 25 to 44, 24.9% from 45 to 64, and 9.3% who were 65 years of age or older. The median age was 34.7 years. For every 100 females, there were 93.7 males. For every 100 females age 18 and over, there were 87.3 males.

== Education ==
The Elmore County portion is in the Elmore County Public School System.

The Autauga County portion is in the Autauga County Schools district.

Chapman Christian Academy is in the Millbrook area. CCA is a small Christian private school.

== Nearby attractions ==
- Spectre set ruins – In the 2003 film Big Fish, the lead character visits the idealistic town of Spectre at multiple points in his life. In reality, the facades of Spectre were built on a private island on the Alabama River. A rundown version of the town was the last to be filmed, so when the sets were abandoned, they already looked as though they had been neglected for decades.

== Notable people ==
- Austin Adams, pitcher for the Detroit Tigers
- Robert Chancey, former NFL running back
- Terrence Long, former Major League Baseball outfielder
- Dee Milliner, former NFL cornerback
- Antowain Smith, former NFL running back

== See also ==
- Stanhope Elmore High School
