= Robert Chancey =

American football player (born 1972)

No. 32, 38, 35
- Position: Fullback

Personal information
- Born: September 7, 1972 (age 54); Macon, Alabama, U.S.
- Listed height: 6 ft 0 in (1.83 m)
- Listed weight: 252 lb (114 kg)

Career information
- High school: Stanhope Elmore (Millbrook, Alabama)
- College: No college
- NFL draft: 1997: undrafted

Career history
- San Diego Chargers (1997); Chicago Bears (1998); Dallas Cowboys (1999); San Diego Chargers (2000)

Career NFL statistics
- Rushing attempts: 85
- Rushing yards: 320
- Receptions: 12
- Receiving yards: 108
- Total touchdowns: 4
- Fumbles: 2
- Stats at Pro Football Reference

Robert Dewayne Chancey (born September 7, 1972) is an American former professional football player who was a fullback in the National Football League (NFL) for the San Diego Chargers, Chicago Bears and Dallas Cowboys. Prior to his professional football career, he was selected in the sixth round of the 1992 MLB draft and spent 4 years playing minor league baseball.

== Early life ==
Chancey attended Millbrook (AL) Stanhope Elmore. His cousin Antowain Smith was one of his teammates. As a senior, he was ranked second in the nation as a running back prospect.

== Professional career ==
=== Professional baseball ===
Chancey chose to play professional baseball instead of attending college. He was selected by the Baltimore Orioles in the 6th round of the 1992 MLB draft and was given a $108,000 signing bonus. He spent two years playing for the Gulf Coast Orioles in the Orioles organization. In 1992, he led Gulf Coast outfielders in errors. The next year, he was limited by a rib injury and had problems hitting curveballs.

In 1994, he played for the independent Beaumont Bullfrogs of the Texas–Louisiana League. In 1996, he was signed by the Kingsport Mets in the New York Mets organization and was released in July.

=== Professional football ===
==== San Diego Chargers (first stint) ====
In September 1996, he had an unsuccessful tryout in Tampa Bay with a scout for the BC Lions of the Canadian Football League. On August 26, 1997, although he did not play college football and had not played since high school, Chancey was signed by the San Diego Chargers after he ran a 4.58 40-yard dash during Antowain Smith's pro day. On November 4, he was promoted from the Chargers' practice squad to replace fullback Carwell Gardner. He appeared in six games, playing exclusively on special teams.

On April 14, 1998, Chancey was re-signed by the Chargers. On July 24, he was released during the training camp to make room for Natrone Means.

==== Chicago Bears ====
On July 26, 1998, he was signed by the Chicago Bears, where he appeared in all 16 games with one start (the season opener). During the season, he rushed the ball 29 times for 122 yards and scored two touchdowns. He also caught 11 passes for 102 yards, while also fumbling twice. He also returned two kickoffs for 18 yards. On September 5, 1999, he was waived by the Bears.

==== Dallas Cowboys ====
On October 5, 1999, he was signed by the Dallas Cowboys to be the third-string running back. He appeared in three games, rushing the ball 14 times for 57 yards against the Green Bay Packers.

==== San Diego Chargers (second stint) ====
On February 15, 2000, he was signed to an offer sheet by the San Diego Chargers. That season, he appeared in four games, starting three. He rushed the ball 42 times for 141 yards and two touchdowns. He also caught one pass for six yards. He also attempted his only pass as a professional. He was cut on February 28, 2001.
