= Lucy St. Louis =

English actress and singer

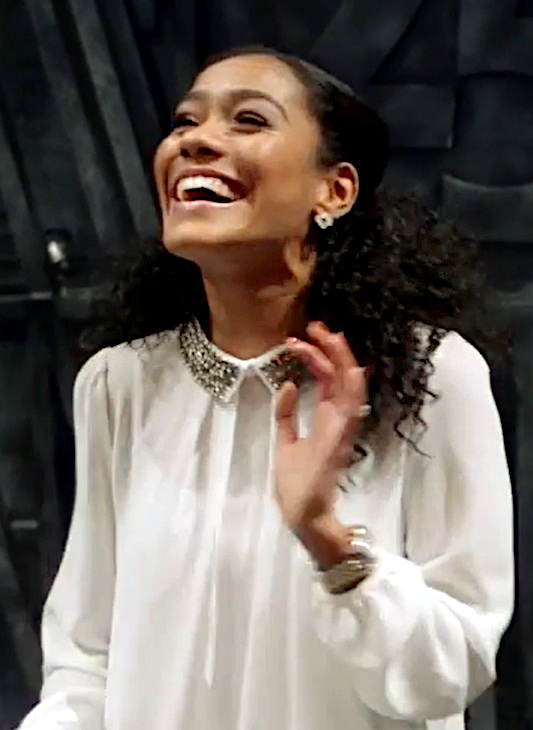
- St Louis in 2016
- Other names: Lucy St Louis; Lucy Clare
- Years active: 2009–present
- Spouse: Ben Clare (m. 2018)
- Children: 1

Lucy St. Louis is an English actress and singer. From 2021 to 2023, she played Christine Daaé in the West End production of The Phantom of the Opera, making her the first Black performer to do so. She was then cast as Glinda in Wicked, also in the West End.

St. Louis has also played Diana Ross in Motown: The Musical, Antonia in Man of La Mancha, Guenevere in Camelot in Concert, and Little Eva in Beautiful: The Carole King Musical.

== Early life ==
St. Louis grew up in London and is of Barbadian descent. St. Louis began her vocal training from the age of seven. She mentioned being inspired to pursue musical theatre by her grandmother, with whom she would watch old-style MGM musicals, "learn all the words and sing and dance around the house".

She left school at sixteen to pursue the performing arts. She trained at Laine Theatre Arts, graduating in 2012 and was cast in Ragtime halfway through her final year.

== Stage career ==
St. Louis had her career breakthrough during her last year of musical theatre school in 2012, being cast in the ensemble of Ragtime.

The following year, in 2013, she was cast as first cover Nabalungi in The Book of Mormon at the Prince of Wales Theatre.

In 2015, St. Louis portrayed Shirelle/Little Eva in Beautiful: the Carole King Musical at the Aldwych Theatre, alongside Katie Brayben as Carole.

In 2021 St. Louis became the first Black actress to ever portray the lead role of Christine Daaé in Andrew Lloyd Webber's The Phantom of the Opera. For this portrayal she was nominated as Best Female Actor in a Musical at the Black British Theatre Awards in the same year.

St. Louis was announced as Glinda in Wicked in London starting from March 2023. She played the role alongside Alexia Khadime as Elphaba, making this the first instance where both leading roles were played by two actors of colour.

In 2023, St. Louis joined a star-studded cast for My Favourite Things, the 80th Anniversary Concert of Rodgers and Hammerstein at the Theatre Royal, Drury Lane. Other performers included: Aaron Tveit, Audra McDonald, Joanna Ampil, Maria Friedman, Michael Ball, Daniel Dae Kim, Julian Ovenden, Marisha Wallace and Patrick Wilson. Rita Moreno also made an appearance during the concert. The show was filmed and a two-discs version of all songs made available the following year.

== Filmography ==
Year	Title	Role	Notes
2017	Beauty and the Beast	Debutante	
2021	Now or Never	Self	TV special
2022	The Silent Twins	Performer	
2024	Great Performances	Self	TV series
2024	My Favourite Things: the Rodgers and Hammerstein 80 Anniversary	Self	Concert

== Stage ==
Year	Title	Role	Notes
2009	Peter Pan	Tiger Lily	Hawth Theatre, Crawley
2011	Alan Jay Lerner Memorial	Soloist	St Paul's, Covent Garden
2011	Ultimate Broadway	Vocalist	Shanghai Culture Square, Shanghai
2012	Ragtime	Ensemble	Regent's Park Open Air Theatre, London
2012	Peter Pan	Tiger Lily	Venue Cymru, Llandudno
2013	The Book of Mormon	Nabulungi (understudy)	Prince of Wales Theatre, London
2015	Beautiful: The Carole King Musical	Shirelle / Little Eva	Aldwych Theatre, London
2016	Motown: The Musical	Diana Ross	Shaftesbury Theatre, London
2019	Man of La Mancha	Antonia	English National Opera, London Coliseum
2021–23	The Phantom of the Opera	Christine Daaé	Her Majesty's Theatre, London
2022	Camelot	Guenevere	London Palladium
2023	My Favourite Things, The Rodgers & Hammerstein 80 Anniversary Concert	Self	Theatre Royal, Drury Lane
2023–2025	Wicked	Glinda	Apollo Victoria Theatre, London
2025	Top Hat	Dale Tremont	Chichester Festival Theatre

== Awards and nominations ==
Year	Award	Category	Work	Result	Ref.
2021	Black British Theatre Awards	Best Female Actor in a Musical	The Phantom of the Opera	Won	
2024	WhatsOnStage Awards	Best Takeover Performance	Wicked	Nominated	
