= Big Fish: A Novel of Mythic Proportions =

Novel by Daniel Wallace

- First edition cover
- Author: Daniel Wallace
- Language: English
- Genre: Magical realism
- Publisher: Pandher Books
- Publication date: October 1, 1998
- Publication place: United States
- Media type: Print (hardback & paperback)
- Pages: 180 pp
- ISBN: 1-56512-217-8
- OCLC: 39269578
- Dewey Decimal: 813/.54 21
- LC Class: PS3573.A4256348 B5 1998

Big Fish: A Novel of Mythic Proportions is a 1998 novel by Daniel Wallace. It was adapted into a film, Big Fish, in 2003 by Tim Burton. A musical adaptation starring Norbert Leo Butz premiered in Chicago in April 2013.

== Plot summary ==
A young man (William Bloom), at the deathbed of his father (Edward Bloom), tries to reconcile his memories of his dad with the person he really is. Where as he always saw his father as an irresponsible liar, he comes to understand his dad's exaggerations.

The book is written in a chronological (although they may not appear so at first) series of tall tales. Despite the novel's first-person narration, there is no present tense part of the book. The various stories are Will's retelling of tales that Edward has told about his life. The 'My Father's Death Take' chapters are William planning out his final conversation with his father in his head and how it will go, so that when the actual conversation takes place, he will be able to get to bottom of the truth and of truly understanding his father.

The book draws elements from the epic poem the Odyssey and James Joyce's Ulysses.

== Characters ==
- Edward Bloom – the protagonist. Edward is the center of all the tales told; through these stories, pieces of his character are revealed through his actions, as well as the people he encounters, and the places he passes through.
- William Bloom – son of Edward. William appears in the "Death Takes", as he tries to extract the truth from his father (only to be further frustrated with his lack of seriousness).
- Jenny Hill – owns the last part of Specter. She was in love with Edward.
- Dr. Bennett – was a family doctor and an old friend. He is a very old man who can't even stand for a long time. He has been into doctoring even before William was born and at that time was being asked to retire. He is emotional and tries everything to see to the survival of Edward.
- Sandra Kay Templeton – Edward's wife whom he meets while at Auburn. Don Price asks Sandra to marry him before Edward has a chance to make his move, but Sandra says that she wants to think about it, which gives Edward the chance to win her over himself.
- Don Price – a college student at Auburn. Edward has a run in with Don over the magical glass eye of the old woman who owns the boarding house that Edward is staying in. Don is the leader of a group of boys who steals the eye, and Edward tricks Don into entrusting him with the eye overnight which he promptly gives back to the woman. Don then sees his future in the woman's eye when Edward returns to meet Don and the boys the next day with the old lady in tow. Don and Edward later have another run in over their mutual love for Sandra Templeton that results in a fistfight between the two. Edward wins both the fight and Sandra's heart.
