= Jackson Lake Island =

Private island in Alabama, United States

Coordinates: 32°26′55″N 86°20′00″W

Spectre
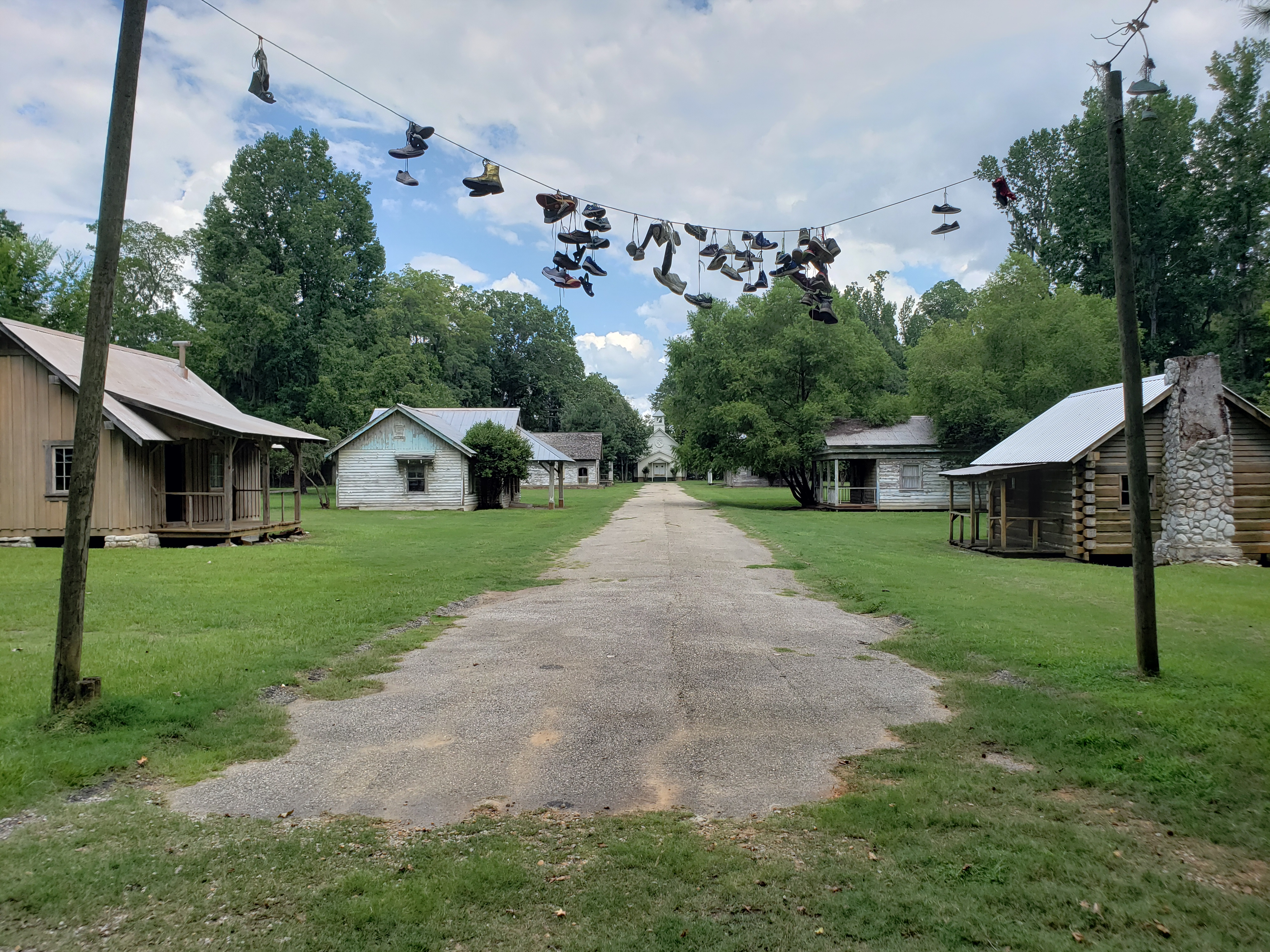
- Photo of town showing the shoe wire, several houses, and the church
- Interactive map of Spectre
- Location: Jackson Lake; Millbrook, AL; United States
- Established: 2003

Jackson Lake Island is a private island in Elmore County, Alabama, which contains the fictional town of Spectre, built as a film set for the 2003 film Big Fish. After production of the film ended, the set was initially abandoned, then partially renovated for use as a tourist attraction.

== Town of Spectre ==
Tim Burton, director of the movie Big Fish, besides filming one week in Paris, filmed the entirety of the film in Alabama. Scenes in the film containing the town of Spectre were filmed on custom movie sets on a private island in Lake Jackson, a lake that lies between Montgomery and Millbrook, Alabama. The "town", despite not being inhabited by any civilians, was created to look abandoned. Although the insides of many of the houses are not furnished and do not have proper flooring and walls, the outside of the houses are decorated in a way to intentionally look broken and decayed.

After Edward (played by Ewan McGregor and Albert Finney) and Karl (Matthew McGrory) go their separate ways down a forked road in Big Fish, Edward discovers a swamp and within is the secret town of Spectre.

Although several houses are not furnished and lack proper flooring, there are a few that have somewhat proper insides that were used for filming: for example, the house with a fireplace where Norther Winslow (played by Steve Buscemi), the town poet, ate pie.

A few years after filming concluded, some buildings began to collapse. When the owners attempted to clear the debris, sparks caused a fire that went across the road and caught other buildings on fire. The "town's" commercial district was destroyed in the fire. Eventually, the house that belonged to the character Jenny (played by Helena Bonham Carter) was torn down due to flooding hazards.

== Wildlife ==
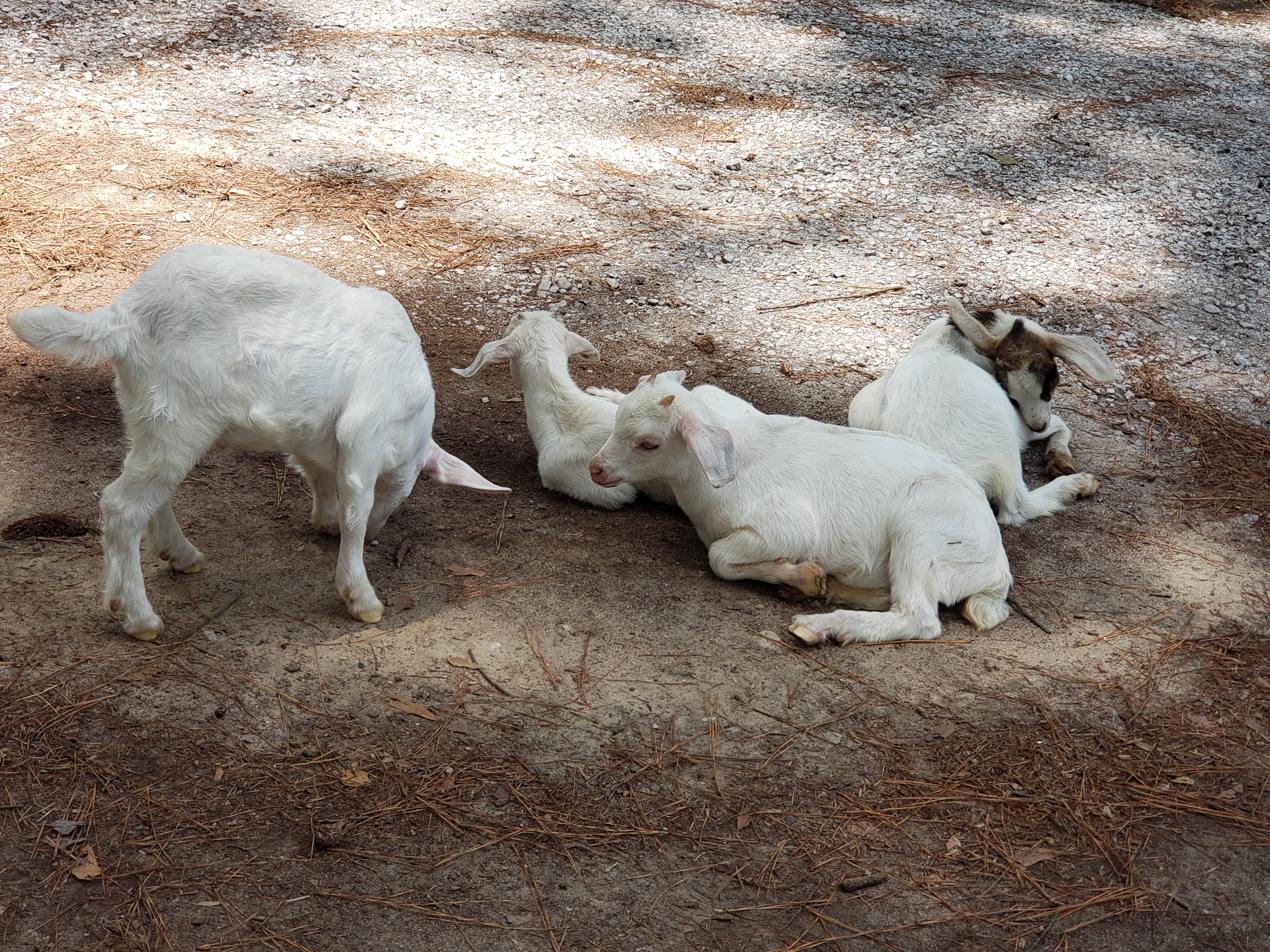
Domesticated goats on Jackson Lake Island

As the movie site was abandoned, the lake and surrounding land became inhabited with many different types of wildlife. Goats can often be seen wandering around in a tribe near the abandoned set. As they were raised on an island with plenty of tourism, they have become domesticated and comfortably walk around people.

Ducks and turtles are commonly seen around the swamp-like lake, mainly in areas where decayed trees sit standing out of the water.

== Present use ==
The current owners of the island allow visitors to access the island and walk around the movie set, which is no longer used for any films. The island contains public facilities such as bathrooms, public grills so visitors can cook food, and picnic tables scattered around the island. There is also a playground for children to play on. Because of the lake and abandoned "town" from the movie set, the island has become a popular place to take photographs.

Visitors to the island can also pay a small fee to enter the island with a boat and fishing gear in order to fish in the freshwater lake. The two most common types of fish found near the island are bass and catfish, and the lake has become a common fishing ground for locals. Due to the dead trees and moss, the fish have many places to make their homes to hide in and hunt.
