= Dee Milliner =

American football player (born 1991)

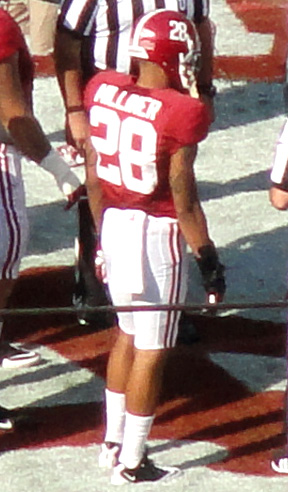
- Milliner with the Alabama Crimson Tide in 2012

No. 27
- Position: Cornerback

Personal information
- Born: September 14, 1991 (age 35); Deatsville, Alabama, U.S.
- Listed height: 6 ft 0 in (1.83 m)
- Listed weight: 201 lb (91 kg)

Career information
- High school: Stanhope Elmore (Millbrook, Alabama)
- College: Alabama (2010–2012)
- NFL draft: 2013: 1st round, 9th overall pick

Career history
- New York Jets (2013–2016)

Awards and highlights
- 2× BCS national champion (2012, 2013); Unanimous All-American (2012); First-team All-SEC (2012)

Career NFL statistics
- Total tackles: 63
- Pass deflections: 19
- Interceptions: 3
- Stats at Pro Football Reference

DeMarcus Armon "Dee" Milliner (born September 14, 1991) is an American former professional football player who was a cornerback in the National Football League (NFL). He was selected by the New York Jets in the first round of the 2013 NFL draft. He played college football for the Alabama Crimson Tide, and was recognized as a unanimous All-American in 2012.

== Early life ==
A native of Millbrook, Alabama, Milliner attended Stanhope Elmore High School in Millbrook, where he played football and ran track. In football, he was a starting defensive back ever since his freshman year at Alabama's highest high school football level (6A). In January 2014 the Alabama High School Athletic Association re-aligned to seven classifications, with 32 teams competing at the 7A level. In his first start against Auburn High School he intercepted a pass and ran it back 40 yards for a touchdown. By his sophomore year, Milliner was a Montgomery Advertiser All-Metro 5A-6A selection. After finishing his junior season with 57 tackles (33 solo) and seven interceptions (two of them returned for touchdowns), he earned 6A ASWA All-State honorable mention. He made 71 tackles as a senior in 2009 while intercepting three passes and breaking up eight passes as opposing offenses chose to throw away from his side of the field. He was a consensus All-State first teamer, and a 2009 USA Today All-American selection. Milliner was selected to the Under Armour All-America Game and played in the Alabama-Mississippi All-Star Classic.

Milliner was also an standout track and field athlete at Stanhope Elmore, where he competed in events ranging from the 100-meters to the long jump. At the 2008 Auburn Invitation, he placed 1st in the long jump event at 21 ft 3 in (6.52 m). He finished 8th in the 200-meter dash at the 2009 Central-Falcon Invitational, with a time of 22.00 seconds. He recorded a personal-best time of 10.86 seconds in the 100-meter dash at the 2009 AHSAA 4A-6A State Meet, where he took 4th.

Regarded as a five-star recruit by Rivals.com, Milliner was listed as the No. 2 cornerback nationally, behind only Lamarcus Joyner, while Scout.com ranked him No. 1 among cornerbacks. Growing up in a family of Alabama fans, Milliner picked the Crimson Tide over offers from Auburn, Georgia, Oklahoma, and Tennessee, among others. Milliner was Alabama's highest rated recruit of the 2010 class.

College recruiting
Name	Hometown	School	Height	Weight	40^{‡}	Commit date
Dee Milliner; CB	Millbrook, AL	Stanhope Elmore (AL)	6 ft 0 in (1.83 m)	200 lb (91 kg)	4.4	Nov 21, 2009
Dee Milliner; CB	Recruit ratings: Scout: Rivals: (84)					
Overall recruit ranking: Scout: 1 (CB) Rivals: 2 (CB), 1 (AL) ESPN: 2 (CB)
Note: In many cases, Scout, Rivals, 247Sports, On3, and ESPN may conflict in their listings of height and weight.; In these cases, the average was taken. ESPN grades are on a 100-point scale.; Sources: "Alabama Football Commitments". Rivals.; "2010 Alabama Football Commits". Scout.; "ESPN". ESPN.; "Scout.com Team Recruiting Rankings". Scout.; "2010 Team Ranking". Rivals.com.

== College career ==
Milliner attended the University of Alabama, where he played for coach Nick Saban's Alabama Crimson Tide football team from 2010 to 2012. As a true freshman in 2010, he played in all 13 games and earned 11 starts. Three times he was named among the Defensive Players of the Week by the Alabama coaching staff. His season-high eight tackles came against Mississippi State. Milliner registered his first career interception against Georgia State, on November 18. After the season, he was named a 2010 Freshman All-American by College Football News.

In his sophomore season, Milliner was the third cornerback in Alabama's depth chart, behind Dre Kirkpatrick and DeQuan Menzie. He played in all 13 games and started six, including in all nickel or dime situations. He had 27 tackles, and ranked second on the team with nine pass breakups while leading the team with three interceptions that he returned for 72 yards. Early in the season, against No. 23 Penn State, Milliner broke up a career best three passes in the Tide's 27–11 win. In the 2011 Iron Bowl against Auburn, he made a season-high six tackles with four solo stops. Milliner intercepted his third pass of the season early in the fourth quarter and returned it 35 yards for a game-clinching score.

With Kirkpatrick and Menzie leaving for the NFL after the 2011 season, Milliner was Alabama's undisputed top cornerback. Apart from the Western Kentucky game, which he missed due to a strained hip flexor, he started all games of the season, and totaled 51 tackles with two interceptions and 18 pass breakups, which ranks third on Alabama's single-season list. Milliner led the Southeastern Conference with 1.67 passes defended per game, and twice totaled four pass breakups in a game (Michigan and Mississippi) plus three at Missouri. He was subsequently named a unanimous first-team All-American, while also being among the finalists for the Bronko Nagurski Trophy and Jim Thorpe Award.

=== College statistics ===
Year	GP–GS	Tackles				Sacks	Pass Defense				Fumbles		Blocked
Year	GP–GS	Solo	Ast	Total	Loss–Yards	No–Yards	Int–Yards	BU	PD	QBH	Rcv–Yards	FF	Kick
2010	13–11	41	14	55	4.0–12	0.0–0	1–0	7	8	1	0–0	1	0
2011	13–6	14	13	27	1.0–7	0.0–0	3–72	9	12	0	0–0	0	0
2012	12–12	33	18	51	4.0–19	1.5–11	2–35	18	20	0	1–17	1	1

== Professional career ==
=== Pre-draft ===
While not included in pre-season mock drafts for the 2013 NFL draft in May 2012, Milliner worked his way up during the year and was projected as a high first-rounder by mid-season. In late January 2013, Sports Illustrated projected Milliner to be selected No. 6 overall by the Cleveland Browns. A torn labrum in Milliner's right shoulder caused him to miss the NFL Combine's bench press, but he completed all the other drills at the combine, though he had shocking positional drills results due to dropped balls. Milliner underwent shoulder surgery on March 12, 2013. He returned in time for the start of NFL training camps. After the combine, SI projected Milliner to be selected No. 2 overall by the Jaguars, which would make him the highest selected defensive back since Eric Turner in 1991. In March 2013, Pat Kirwan of CBSSports.com projected Milliner to be the No. 2 selection by the Chiefs. Since Gary Glick in 1956, no defensive back had been selected first overall.

External videos
- Dee Milliner's 40-yard dash
- Milliner's NFL Combine workout
- Milliner's NFL Combine interview

Pre-draft measurables
Height	Weight	Arm length	Hand span	40-yard dash	10-yard split	20-yard split	20-yard shuttle	Three-cone drill	Vertical jump	Broad jump
5 ft 11 7/8 in (1.83 m)	201 lb (91 kg)	32 in (0.81 m)	8 3/4 in (0.22 m)	4.37 s	1.52 s	2.50 s	4.32 s	6.95 s	36 in (0.91 m)	10 ft 2 in (3.10 m)
All values from NFL Combine

=== 2013 ===
The New York Jets selected Milliner in the first round (ninth overall) of the 2013 NFL draft. He became the third Alabama cornerback in four years selected in the first round, after Kareem Jackson and Dre Kirkpatrick. Milliner was also the highest selected Alabama cornerback since Antonio Langham in 1994.

External videos
- Jets select Dee Milliner 9th overall
- Dee Milliner's 2010 NFL Draft interview

On July 29, 2013, the Jets signed Milliner to a fully guaranteed four-year, $12.66 million contract that includes a $7.58 million signing bonus and offset language.

Milliner was named the starting cornerback for the 2013 season alongside Antonio Cromartie. Milliner experienced a tumultuous start to his career, being benched 3 times during games for his lackluster performance. Milliner ended the season, however, with a strong performance, recording his first interception in week 16 against the Cleveland Browns followed up by two interceptions against the Miami Dolphins in Week 17 to earn AFC defensive player of the week awards as well as the NFL Defensive Rookie of the Month honors. In 13 games (12 starts) of 2013, Milliner made 56 tackles with 15 passes defended, and 3 interceptions.

=== 2014 ===
Milliner suffered an ankle sprain during training camp, keeping him out until opening day. Milliner returned to action on September 14, 2014, against the Green Bay Packers. During Week 6 against the Denver Broncos on October 13, 2014, Milliner left the game with an Achilles tendon injury. The next day, an MRI revealed that his Achilles tendon was torn, prematurely ending his 2014 season. Limited to just 3 games in 2014, Milliner registered 6 tackles and a pass defended.

=== 2015 ===
On August 7, 2015, Milliner underwent wrist surgery that required 6–8 weeks to recover. On September 6, 2015, the Jets placed Milliner on the injured/designated for return list. He was activated November 11, 2015.

=== 2016 ===
The Jets declined to pick up the fifth-year option of Milliner's contract on May 2, 2016, after Milliner played just 21 games of a possible 48 in three seasons. Milliner was waived/injured by the Jets on September 3, 2016. After clearing waivers, he reverted to the team's injured reserve list. He was released on September 28, 2016.
