= Aaron Traywick =

American life extension activist (1989–2018)

- Born: December 19, 1989; Elmore, Alabama, U.S.
- Died: April 29, 2018 (aged 28); Washington, D.C., U.S.
- Education: University of Montevallo
- Occupations: Life extension activist; businessman

Aaron James Traywick (December 19, 1989 – April 29, 2018) was an American businessman and life extension activist in the transhumanism and biohacking communities. He sought to develop gene therapies to make inexpensive treatments available for incurable conditions such as AIDS and the herpes simplex virus. His lack of any medical training and his unconventional methods—such as broadcasting an associate injecting himself with an "untested experimental gene therapy", then later doing the same to himself in an onstage public demonstration—drew widespread criticism.

== Education ==
Aaron Traywick was a resident of Elmore, Alabama, and a graduate of Stanhope Elmore High School. He graduated from the University of Montevallo in Alabama with a degree in interdisciplinary studies; he held no background in the sciences or formal training in clinical medicine.

== Career ==
From January 2016 to his termination in July 2016, he worked to advocate investment in radical approaches towards anti-aging at the Global Healthspan Policy Institute started by his cousin. In 2017 he founded Ascendance Biomedical in Washington, D.C., with the mission to "make cutting edge biomedical technologies available for everyone".

Traywick's self-administered do it yourself homemade gene therapies received substantial media attention. In October 2017, Ascendance Biomedical shared a live broadcast of Traywick's associate Tristan Roberts injecting himself with an "untested experimental gene therapy" for HIV over Facebook's live-streaming service. During a presentation at the February 2018 BodyHacking Con in Austin, Texas, Traywick injected himself with something he referred to at the time as a "research compound". In a later conversation with BBC reporters, he spoke of it as a "treatment" for Herpes virus, a term with a specific meaning subject to FDA regulations. Shortly after the event, the FDA issued a statement on the inherent dangers of this approach to untested gene editing, without mentioning the company by name:

The FDA is aware that gene therapy products intended for self-administration and "do it yourself" kits to produce gene therapies for self-administration are being made available to the public. The sale of these products is against the law. FDA is concerned about the safety risks involved. Consumers are cautioned to make sure that any gene therapy they are considering has either been approved by FDA or is being studied under appropriate regulatory oversight.

— US Food and Drug Administration

At the time of his death, Traywick was planning a CRISPR gene therapy trial for the treatment of lung cancer in Tijuana, Mexico, and served as managing director for Inovium Rejuvenation, which was conducting pre-enrollment for FDA-approved trials in several US locations to reverse menopause, rejuvenate ovaries, restore fertility, and bring hormone levels back in line with those found in youth.

He is featured as a subject in the 2020 Showtime documentary Citizen Bio, directed by Trish Dolman. He is also a subject in the limited Netflix series Unnatural Selection.

== Death ==
On April 29, 2018, Traywick was found dead in a sensory deprivation isolation tank, or "float pod," at a float spa in Washington, D.C., aged 28. His body was discovered after spa staff noticed that he did not leave the float room after his appointment time had ended and the tank had automatically drained.

A spokesperson for the spa told news media that drug paraphernalia was found among Traywick's belongings, though police did not confirm this at the time. Traywick's autopsy, reported on in June 2018, concluded that he died from drowning; the drug ketamine was also found in his system. Ketamine, a dissociative anesthetic, is sometimes used as a recreational drug.

== See also ==
- Immortalists
