= Mr. Sebastian and the Negro Magician =

2007 novel by Daniel Wallace

- First edition cover
- Author: Daniel Wallace
- Language: English
- Publisher: Doubleday
- Publication date: July 3, 2007
- Publication place: United States
- Media type: Print (Hardcover and Paperback)
- Pages: 272 pp
- ISBN: 0-385-52109-X
- OCLC: 71210178
- Dewey Decimal: 813/.54 22
- LC Class: PS3573.A4256348 M7 2007

Mr. Sebastian and the Negro Magician is a novel published in 2007 by Daniel Wallace. It was adapted for the stage in 2013 by Shane Morgan of Rough House Theatre under the title Henry Walker and the Wheel of Death. The four-night run was at the Rondo Theatre in Bath.
