= Stanhope Elmore High School =

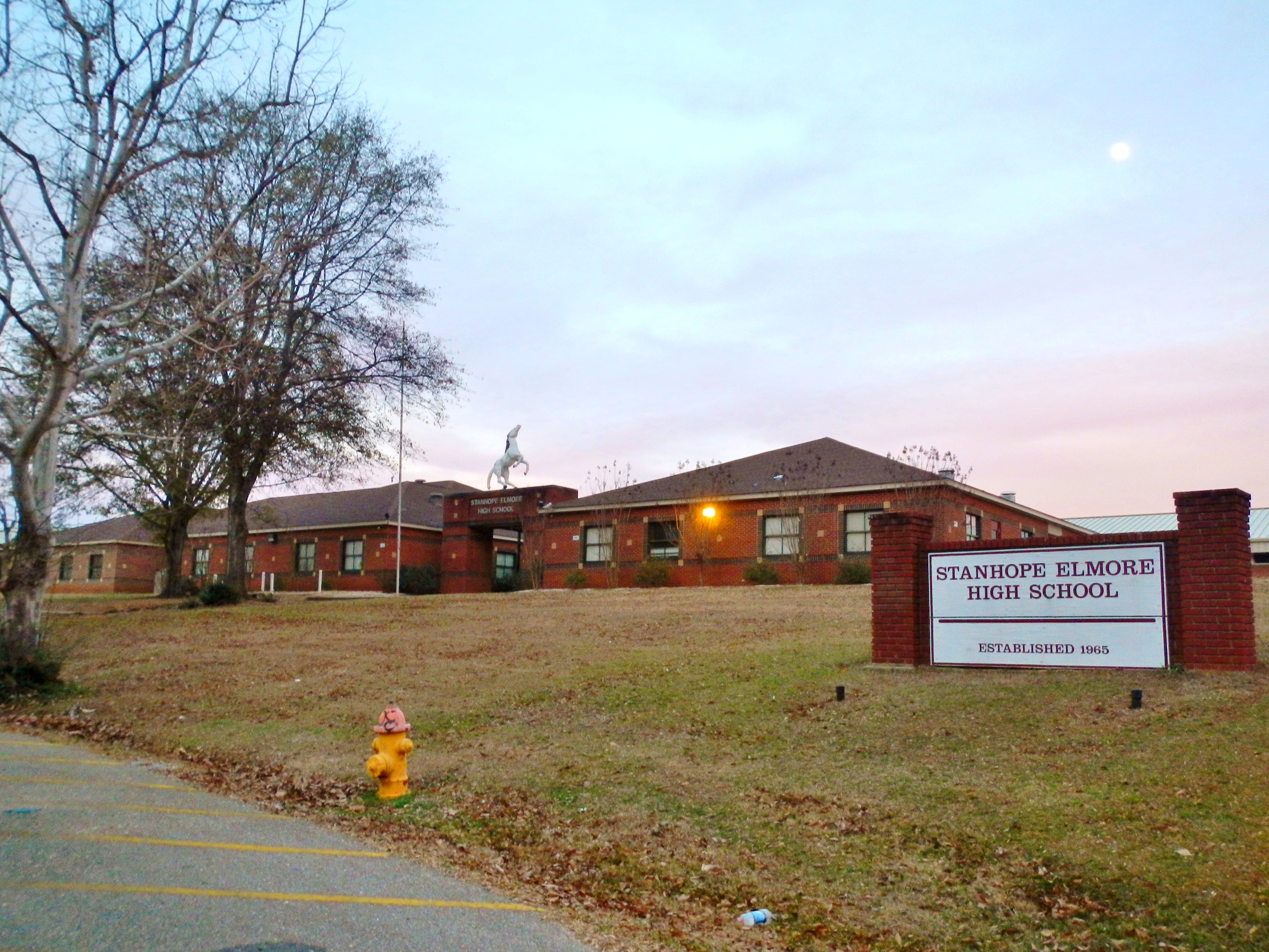

Location
- 4300 Main Street; Millbrook, Alabama 36054; United States; 32°29′38″N 86°21′43″W

Information
- School type: Public
- Established: 1965 (61 years ago)
- School district: Elmore County
- CEEB code: 011758
- Principal: Ewell Fuller
- Teaching staff: 65.00 (FTE)
- Grades: 9–12
- Enrollment: 1,088 (2023–2024)
- Student to teacher ratio: 16.74
- Colors: Cardinal and white
- Nickname: Mustangs
- Rival: Wetumpka High School
- Website: sehs.elmoreco.com

Stanhope Elmore High School is a grades 9–12 school in Millbrook, Alabama, United States. As part of the Elmore County Public School System, the school is the Home of the Mustangs, Foshee-Henderson Stadium, and the Pride of Millbrook Marching Band.

== History ==
Stanhope Elmore High School was founded in 1965 and is named after former Alabama Secretary of State Albert Stanhope Elmore (1827–1909).

== Enrollment ==
As of 2015, enrollment was 1,087 students. Enrollment demographics are 50.4% White, 41.3% Black, 4.3% Hispanic, 1.9% two or more races, 1.5% Asian, 0.4% Native American, and 0.2% Pacific Islander. The student-teacher ratio is 18:1. As 1 of only 4 public high schools in the Elmore County Public School System, the school draws students from the city of Millbrook and the towns of Coosada, Deatsville, and Elmore.

== Athletics ==
=== Baseball ===
- Stanhope Elmore won its first state title in 2006.

== Notable alumni ==
- Austin Adams, baseball player
- Jake Andrews, football player
- Shannon Brown, basketball/football player
- Robert Chancey, former football player
- Patrick Dopson, gospel artist
- Terrence Long, former baseball player
- Dee Milliner, football player
- Antowain Smith, former football player
- William C. Thompson, Presiding Judge, Alabama Court of Civil Appeals
- Aaron Traywick, biohacker
