= Robinson Springs United Methodist Church =

Historic church in Alabama, United States

- U.S. National Register of Historic Places
- Alabama Register of Landmarks and Heritage
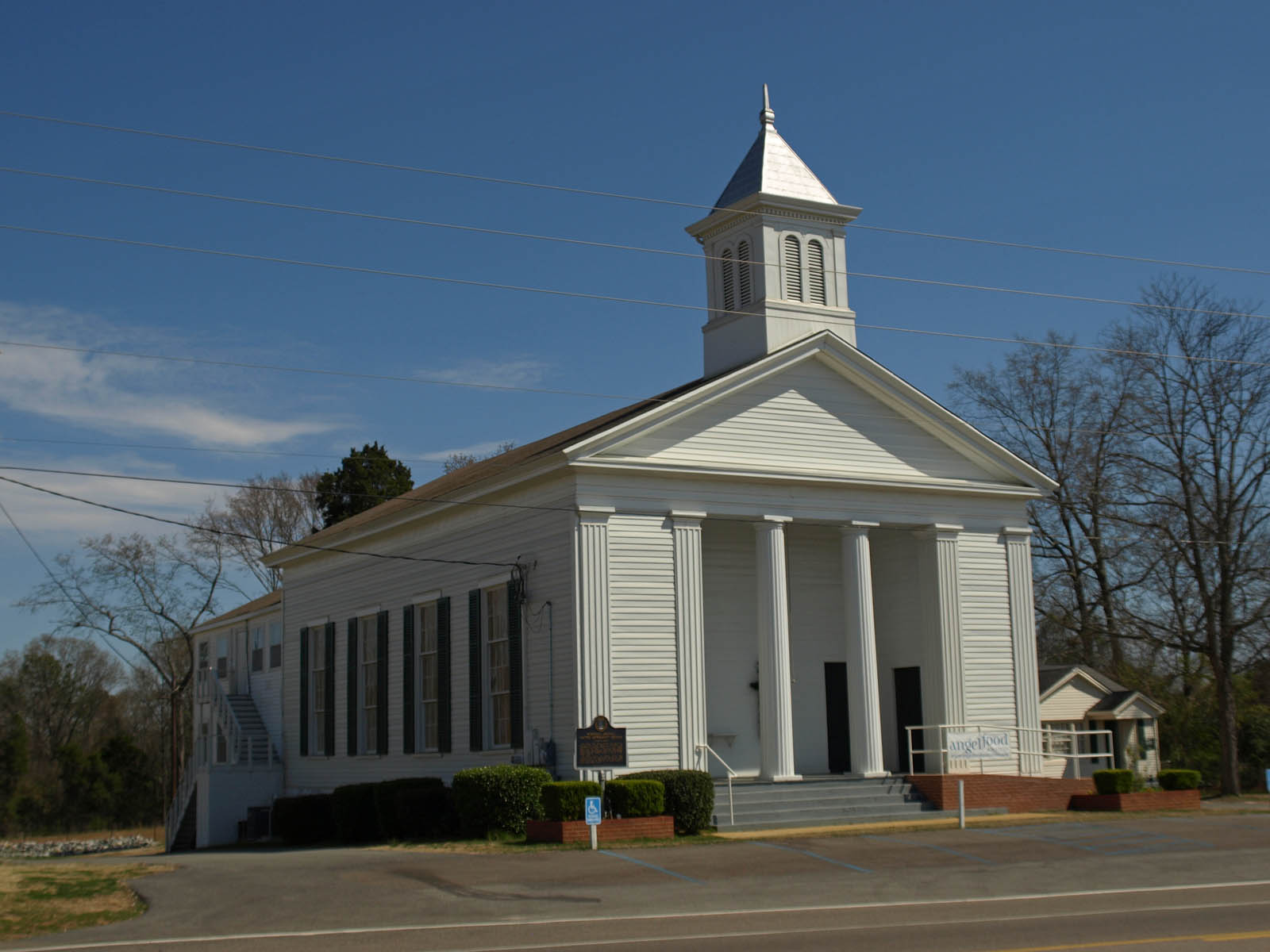

- Location within Alabama Location within the United States
- Location: AL 14 and AL 143, Millbrook, Alabama
- Coordinates: 32°30′55″N 86°22′28″W
- Area: less than one acre
- Built: 1848
- Architectural style: Greek Revival
- NRHP reference No.: 82002012

Significant dates
- Added to NRHP: March 1, 1982
- Designated ARLH: July 21, 1977

Robinson Springs United Methodist Church is a historic church in Millbrook, Alabama, US. Built in 1848, it was added to the Alabama Register of Landmarks and Heritage in 1977 and the National Register of Historic Places in 1982.

== See also ==
- Historical Marker Database
