= Antowain Smith =

American football player (born 1972)

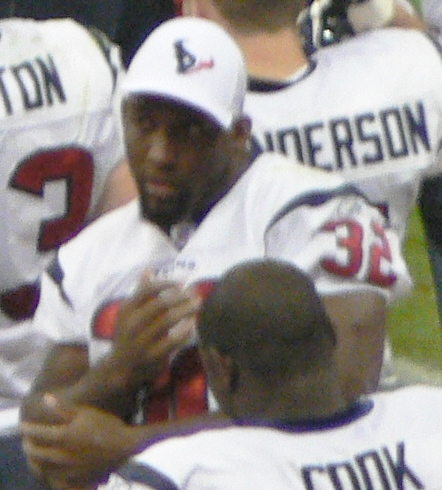
- Smith with the Houston Texans in 2006

No. 23, 32
- Position: Running back

Personal information
- Born: March 14, 1972 (age 54); Millbrook, Alabama, U.S.
- Listed height: 6 ft 2 in (1.88 m)
- Listed weight: 232 lb (105 kg)

Career information
- High school: Stanhope Elmore (Millbrook)
- College: East Mississippi JC (1993–1994); Houston (1995–1996)
- NFL draft: 1997: 1st round, 23rd overall pick

Career history
- Buffalo Bills (1997–2000); New England Patriots (2001–2003); Tennessee Titans (2004); New Orleans Saints (2005); Houston Texans (2006)*
- * Offseason or practice squad member only

Awards and highlights
- 2× Super Bowl champion (XXXVI, XXXVIII); C-USA Offensive Player of the Year (1996); First-team All-C-USA (1996)

Career NFL statistics
- Rushing yards: 6,881
- Rushing average: 3.9
- Rushing touchdowns: 54
- Receptions: 136
- Receiving yards: 982
- Receiving touchdowns: 3
- Stats at Pro Football Reference

Antowain Drurell Smith (born March 14, 1972) is an American former professional football player who was a running back for nine seasons in the National Football League (NFL), most notably with the New England Patriots, with whom he won two Super Bowls, and the Buffalo Bills. At 6'2", 232 pounds, Smith's powerful running style made him an effective runner between the tackles.

== Early life ==
Smith attended Stanhope Elmore High School in Millbrook, Alabama and played football only in his senior year.

== College career ==
Smith worked in a factory for two years before enrolling at East Mississippi Junior College in 1993. At East Mississippi, Smith was a JUCO All-American running back. In 1995, Smith transferred to the University of Houston and played two seasons on the Houston Cougars football team at running back. In 21 games with Houston, Smith rushed for 1,847 yards and 19 touchdowns. Among records set by Smith include the longest touchdown in school history at 96 yards and six touchdowns in one game.

In his senior season, Smith rushed for 1,239 yards and 14 touchdowns, while also catching 28 passes for 201 yards and another score.

== Professional career ==
Antowain Smith was drafted in the first round of the 1997 NFL draft by the Buffalo Bills. In his rookie season Smith ran for 840 yards and 8 touchdowns with also catching 28 passes. The next season Smith ran for 1,124 yards and again scored 8 times, although his yards per carry dropped from 4.3 to 3.7. Smith gained just 27 total yards in the Bills first round playoff loss in 1998. The next season was disappointing and saw Smith score 6 times while rushing for just 614 yards. He did manage to run for 79 yards and two scores in the Bills' first-round playoff game, but the Bills still lost to the Titans. Having fallen out of favor with the coaching staff, Smith ran for just 354 yards and 4 touchdowns in 2000.

The next season Smith rejuvenated his professional career when he joined the New England Patriots. He ran for 1,157 yards and 12 touchdowns in the regular season. He also ran for 204 yards in the playoffs as the Patriots won Super Bowl XXXVI. Smith's numbers dropped off a bit in 2002 as he ran for 982 yards and 6 touchdowns. He did get more involved in the passing game however, and caught 31 balls including 2 touchdowns. 2003 was Smith's final season in New England and he managed just 642 yards, although he still led the team in rushing. His play improved in the playoffs that year as he ran for 252 yards and 2 scores as Smith and the Patriots won their second Super Bowl championship, Super Bowl XXXVIII.

Smith joined the Titans for 2004 and he ran for 509 yards. It was the only season in his career in which he failed to record a single 100 yard game. Smith played his final NFL season in 2005, with the New Orleans Saints, running for 659 yards and 3 scores. For his career Smith played in 131 games, running for 6,881 yards and 54 touchdowns, good for 50th and 44th on the all-time lists respectively.

== NFL career statistics ==
Legend
	Won the Super Bowl
	Led the league
**Bold**	Career high

=== Regular season ===
Year	Team	Games		Rushing					Receiving				
Year	Team	GP	GS	Att	Yds	Avg	Lng	TD	Rec	Yds	Avg	Lng	TD
1997	BUF	16	0	194	840	**4.3**	56	8	28	177	6.3	19	0
1998	BUF	16	14	**300**	1,124	3.7	30	8	5	11	2.2	9	0
1999	BUF	14	11	165	614	3.7	52	6	2	32	**16.0**	23	0
2000	BUF	11	3	101	354	3.5	**59**	4	3	20	6.7	9	0
2001	NWE	16	15	287	**1,157**	4.0	44	**12**	19	192	10.1	**41**	1
2002	NWE	16	15	252	982	3.9	42	6	**31**	**243**	7.8	35	**2**
2003	NWE	13	6	182	642	3.5	30	3	14	92	6.6	16	0
2004	TEN	13	4	137	509	3.7	43	4	22	169	7.7	31	0
2005	NOR	16	7	166	659	4.0	42	3	12	46	3.8	8	0
		131	75	1,784	6,881	3.9	59	54	136	982	7.2	41	3

=== Playoffs ===
Year	Team	Games		Rushing					Receiving				
Year	Team	GP	GS	Att	Yds	Avg	Lng	TD	Rec	Yds	Avg	Lng	TD
1998	BUF	1	1	7	15	2.1	7	0	1	**12**	**12.0**	**12**	0
1999	BUF	1	0	14	79	**5.6**	**44**	**2**	0	0	0.0	0	0
2001	NWE	3	3	53	204	3.8	19	0	1	4	4.0	4	0
2003	NWE	3	3	**64**	**252**	3.9	35	**2**	**2**	9	4.5	8	0
		8	7	138	550	4.0	44	4	4	25	6.3	12	0
