= Valisia LeKae =

American actress and singer (born 1979)

- Born: September 25, 1979 (age 46); Memphis, Tennessee, U.S.
- Occupations: Actress, singer
- Years active: 2002–present

Valisia LeKae (born September 25, 1979) is an American actress and singer. She was nominated for a 2014 Grammy Award and in 2013 she was nominated for the Tony Award for Best Lead Actress in a Musical both for her performance as Diana Ross in the Broadway musical Motown: The Musical.

== Personal life ==
LeKae was born and raised in Memphis, Tennessee, and listened to Motown records in her grandfather's barbershop as a youngster. She started to sing in church at age six and then worked at the Dollywood theme park. LeKae graduated from college with a degree in Psychology and minor in Child and Family Studies from the University of Tennessee, Knoxville.

LeKae left Motown: The Musical in December 2013 to be treated after a diagnosis of ovarian cancer.

In February 2014, LeKae was named spokesperson for The National Ovarian Cancer Coalition.

== Career ==
She starred as Diana Ross in Motown: The Musical on Broadway, which opened in April 2013. The reviewer for TheaterMania wrote of her performance in Motown: The Musical:

The one person who truly shines, though, is Valisia LeKae as Gordy's longtime paramour, superstar Diana Ross. It's not just her almost spot-on re-creation of Miss Ross' breathy voice and steely demeanor that commands our attention. The consistent display of her genuine star power – most evident in a thrilling 'Reach Out and Touch' segment – also draws us in.

The TalkinBroadway reviewer wrote: "Valisia LeKae does a killer impersonation of Ross, and effectively mimics her smoky innocence."

For her performance she was nominated for the Tony Award for Best Actress in a Musical. She was also nominated for a Drama League Award (Distinguished Performance Award) and Outer Critics Circle Award (Outstanding Actress in a Musical) and won the Theatre World Award (Outstanding Broadway or Off-Broadway debut performance).

Previously, she was a swing and understudy in the Broadway productions of The Book of Mormon (2011), Ragtime (2009) for which she was the winner of a Joseph Jefferson Award, and The Threepenny Opera (2006) and a performer in 110 in the Shade (2007).

== Filmography ==
Year	Title	Role	Notes	Ref.
2008	Camelot: Live from Lincoln Center	Ensemble	TV special	
2009-2010	One Life to Live	Evangeline Body Double	2 episodes	
2015	The Adventures of Lillian Kate	Lillian Kate	Web series, 3 episodes	
2017	Blue Bloods	Leah Walker	Episode: "The Forgotten"	
2019	The Blacklist	Gunman #3	Episode: "Dr. Hans Koehler (No. 33)"	
2020	Scenes from Sweet Lorraine	Lorraine Hansberry	Short film	
2022	FBI: Most Wanted	Jade Johnson	Episode: "Shattered"	
2023	The Marvelous Mrs. Maisel	Lucy	Episode: "Susan"	

== Stage credits ==
Year	Title	Role	Venue	Ref.
2003	Mamma Mia	Ensemble	Las Vegas, Mandalay Bay Theatre	
2003-2004	Mamma Mia	Lisa	U.S. National Tour	
2005	Almost Heaven - John Denver's America	Performer	Regional, Center Repertory Company	
2006	The Threepenny Opera	Swing	Broadway, Studio 54	
2006	All Shook Up	Lorraine	U.S. National Tour	
2007	110 in the Shade	Vivian Lorraine Taylor	Broadway, Studio 54	
2008	Caroline, or Change	Emmie Thibodeaux	Regional, TheatreWorks Silicon Valley	
2009	Little Shop of Horrors	Chiffon	Regional, Stages St. Louis	
2010	Ragtime	Ensemble	Broadway, Neil Simon Theatre	
2010	Ragtime	Sarah	Regional, Drury Lane Theatre	
2011-2012	The Book of Mormon	Understudy	Broadway, Eugene O'Neill Theatre	
2013-2015	Motown	Diana Ross	Broadway, Lunt-Fontanne Theatre	
2016	Single	Jessica	Off-Broadway, June Havoc Theatre	
2019	Rock and Roll Man: The Alan Freed Story	Lavern Baker	Regional, Berkshire Theatre Group	
2019	Mark Twain's River of Song	Ensemble	Regional, TheatreWorks Silicon Valley	
2022	SuperHero	Mom	Off-Broadway, The Frank Shiner Theater at the Sheen Center	
2023	Rock & Roll Man	Lavern Baker	Off-Broadway, New World Stages	
2025	The Color Purple	Shug Avery	Regional, Casa Mañana Theatre	

== Awards and nominations ==
Year	Award	Category	Work	Result	Ref.
2010	Joseph Jefferson Award	Outstanding Actress in a Supporting Role - Musical	Ragtime	Won	
2013	Tony Award	Best Actress in a Musical	Motown	Nominated	
2013	Outer Critics Circle Award	Outstanding Actress in a Musical	Motown	Nominated	
2013	Drama League Award	Distinguished Performance	Motown	Nominated	
2013	Theatre World Award	Outstanding Debut	Motown	Won	
2014	Grammy Award	Best Musical Theater Album	Motown	Nominated	
