= Daniel Wallace (author) =

American author (born 1959)

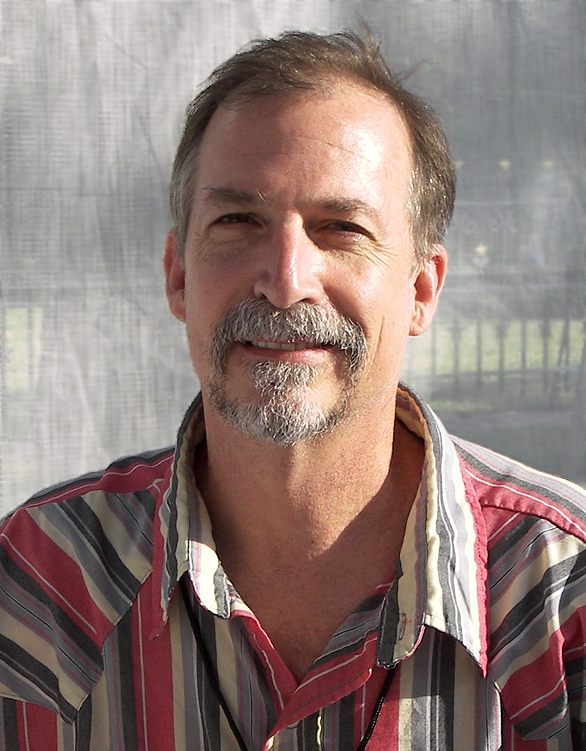
- Wallace at the 2008 Texas Book Festival
- Born: 1959 (age 66–67); Birmingham, Alabama, U.S.
- Education: Emory University; University of North Carolina at Chapel Hill
- Occupation: Writer
- Writing career
- Notable work: Big Fish: A Novel of Mythic Proportions
- Website: danielwallace.org

Daniel Wallace (born 1959) is an American author. He is best known for his 1998 novel Big Fish: A Novel of Mythic Proportions. His other books include Ray in Reverse and The Watermelon King. His stories have also been published in a number of anthologies and magazines, including The Year's Best Fantasy and Horror.

== Life ==
Wallace was born in Birmingham, Alabama, and he has three sisters. He attended Emory University and the University of North Carolina at Chapel Hill, studying English and philosophy. His first job was as a veterinary assistant cleaning cages. Wallace did not graduate from college until May 2008, instead taking a job with a trading company in Nagoya, Japan. He currently lives in Chapel Hill, North Carolina with his wife and son.

Wallace states, of his childhood, that "I was completely average in every way. My childhood was the most uneventful part of my life, I think." He reports, however, that there was friction within his family, as in an interview he states:

My father wanted me to work with him in his company, an import/export firm, and to that end I lived in Japan for a couple of years. But it didn’t work out. It didn’t make me happy and the truth is I wasn’t that good at it. I wouldn’t have been a good businessman. I tried. So I quit – or, if he were alive and you could ask him, fired – and started writing. He wasn’t for it but then it’s hard to support a child in an endeavor for which he has shown absolutely no promise. My mother loved the idea of it because being a writer is such a romantic idea and because it hurt my father, and if he was hurt she was happy.

After returning to Chapel Hill, Wallace worked for thirteen years in a bookstore and as an illustrator, where he designed greeting cards and refrigerator magnets. A running motif in his works are glass eyes; Wallace has stated in numerous interviews (including the one published in the back of the paperback edition of Big Fish) that he collects glass eyes. He continued to live in Chapel Hill with his wife, Laura, a social worker, and their son, Henry.

Of his political beliefs, Wallace has stated, "It is fair to say that I'm left of center. Far left." Wallace claims he is an agnostic in terms of religious beliefs, stating:

I think a lot of people default to Jesus when something inexplicable happens. I write things I didn’t know I was capable of writing, and sometimes that feels like magic. It isn’t; it’s just me. A similar thing happens when a tornado blows someone’s house away, but their cat is found unscathed in an oak tree: God must have been looking out for Pooky. We’re hard-wired to do this, I think, because we’ve been doing it since the beginning.

== Writing ==
Before Wallace's most famous book Big Fish: A Novel of Mythic Proportions was accepted for publication, he wrote five novels which were rejected by publishers. Since then, his books have been translated into 18 languages, while Big Fish was made into a film by Tim Burton. In a 2011 article for Pure Movies, he wrote about how absurd he found it that Big Fish was the book that was adapted into a film when all his others have clearer narrative structures. His other books include Ray in Reverse, The Watermelon King, and Mr. Sebastian and the Negro Magician. His short stories have been published in a number of anthologies and magazines, including The Year's Best Fantasy and Horror.

Wallace says he tries to write everything he can, but mainly focuses on novels and screenplays.

Wallace believes that "art is a distillation of experience." He believes that "writing requires only a pen and paper, and not paint, brushes, canvases, nor expensive film or photographic equipment, so it’s seen as something ‘anyone can do.’"

Of his early writings, Wallace claims:

I thought I was a much better writer then than I do now. I loved the stories I was coming up with, and was really amazed I could put enough sentences together to make a paragraph. It was like magic, seeing the little black marks all come together. I sound like I’m making fun of myself but I’m not. If a writer writes I was a writer. I couldn’t see very far beyond that though. The pure pleasure of invention, of making stuff up, clouded over everything else. I couldn’t tell the difference between a good story and a good story told well. I wrote three hundred pages about a pair of billionaire twins, each weighing just over 500 pounds, who ‘rent’ the mistress of one of their friends. What did I think was going to come of that? Nothing much did. And I wrote a few other books equally as promising. As I wrote I was learning to write (having not gone to school) and I was learning what not to write as well. I also finally figured out that I was writing the kind of books I thought other people wanted to read, not the kind I wanted to write. That’s when Big Fish happened, and why it was a breakthrough for me.

As a child he loved the science fiction novel Dune, by Frank Herbert. Wallace lists his favorite writers as Franz Kafka, Vladimir Nabokov, Italo Calvino, Kurt Vonnegut, and William Faulkner. Wallace also loves the novels Mrs. Bridge and Mr Bridge by Evan S. Connell.

Wallace was awarded the Harper Lee Award for Alabama's Distinguished Writer of the Year in 2019.

== Teaching career ==
Wallace currently is a professor and lecturer in the English Department at the University of North Carolina, Chapel Hill. About his career as a teacher, Wallace has stated:

Teaching undergraduates is much different than teaching graduate or post-graduate students. My job is to foster an appreciation for the art of writing. Showing a student what’s behind the curtain, so he’ll at least be able to see and appreciate these things when he reads a book. If he chooses to write himself – and of course, very few undergraduates pursue writing beyond this level – he knows some of the very basic devices used to creat[e] a compelling story. Rarely does a student leave our program homogenized: even if that were something we wanted to do, we just don’t have them long enough.

== Bibliography ==
- Big Fish: A Novel of Mythic Proportions (1998)
- Ray in Reverse (2000)
- The Watermelon King (2003)
- O Great Rosenfeld! (2005)
- O Great Rosenfeld! Part the 2 (2005)
- Off the Map (2005)
- Mr. Sebastian and the Negro Magician (2007)
- The Kings and Queens of Roam (2013)
- Extraordinary Adventures (2017)
- This Isn't Going to End Well: The True Story of a Man I Thought I Knew (2023)
- Beneath the Moon and Long Dead Stars: Stories (2025)
