= Motown: The Musical =

Jukebox musical

- Music: Various Artists
- Lyrics: Various Artists
- Book: Berry Gordy
- Basis: To Be Loved: The Music, the Magic, the Memories of Motown by Berry Gordy
- Productions: 2013 Broadway; 2014 US Tour; 2016 West End; 2016 Broadway Revival; 2018 UK Tour

Motown: The Musical is a jukebox musical that premiered on Broadway in April 2013. The musical is based on Berry Gordy's autobiography To Be Loved: The Music, the Magic, the Memories of Motown (1994), and on the history of his founding and running of the Motown record label, and his personal and professional relationships with Motown artists such as Diana Ross, Smokey Robinson, Marvin Gaye, and Michael Jackson. The production's music and lyrics are taken from selections from the Motown catalog. It received four nominations at the 67th Tony Awards.

== Productions ==
Motown: The Musical premiered on Broadway, at the Lunt-Fontanne Theatre, on April 14, 2013, after previews starting on March 11. The production was directed by Charles Randolph-Wright, with choreography by Patricia Wilcox, scenic design by David Korins, costumes by ESosa, lighting by Natasha Katz, sound design by Peter Hylenski, and projection design by Daniel Brodie. Music supervision and arrangements were by Ethan Popp, with orchestrations by Ethan Popp and Bryan Crook.

The musical finished its original Broadway run on January 18, 2015, closing after 37 previews and 738 regular performances.

A national tour began in April 2014, featuring Clifton Oliver and Allison Semmes.

The show returned to Broadway on July 12, 2016, for an announced 18-week run at the Nederlander Theatre. However, the run closed earlier than expected, on July 31, 2016.

After speculation that a London production would be staged in the Dominion Theatre, which would be refurbished following the closure of We Will Rock You, an eventual West End production was announced in May 2015 for the Shaftesbury Theatre, which began on February 11, 2016, running until April 20, 2019. The West End production was directed by Charles Randolph-Wright, who also directed this musical on Broadway and its US tour. The cast stars Cedric Neal (as Berry Gordy), Lucy St. Louis (as Diana Ross), Sifiso Mazibuko (as Marvin Gaye), and Obioma Ugoala (as Smokey Robinson). A UK and Ireland tour began on October 11, 2018, at The Alexandra, Birmingham.

== Synopsis ==
In 1983, at the Pasadena Civic Auditorium, recording stars are gathered to celebrate Motown Records' 25th anniversary. In a flashback, the young Berry Gordy watches the neighbors dancing in Detroit. In 1957, the adult Berry forms his own record label, and begins to make lifelong friends with recording artists/singers such as Marvin Gaye and Smokey Robinson. Berry discovers the Supremes and Diana Ross, among many others.

The recording stars sing their popular numbers, including: Diana Ross ("I Hear a Symphony", "You're Nobody till Somebody Loves You", and "You're All I Need to Get By"), Stevie Wonder, The Supremes ("Buttered Popcorn", "Where Did Our Love Go"), The Miracles ("Shop Around"), The Marvelettes ("Please Mr. Postman"), Mary Wells ("Bye Bye Baby"/"Two Lovers Medley"), The Temptations, Martha and the Vandellas ("Dancing in the Street"), The Contours ("Do You Love Me"), and The Jackson 5.

== Original casts ==
Casts of Motown: The Musical
Character	Broadway (2013)	U.S. Tour (2014)	West End (2016)	U.K. Tour (2018)
Berry Gordy	Brandon Victor Dixon	Clifton Oliver	Cedric Neal	Edward Baruwa
Marvin Gaye	Bryan Terrell Clark	Jarran Muse	Sifiso Mazibuko	Shak Gabbidon-Williams
Smokey Robinson	Charl Brown	Nicholas Christopher	Charl Brown	Nathan Lewis
Diana Ross	Valisia LeKae	Allison Semmes	Lucy St. Louis	Karis Anderson
Young Berry Gordy/Young Michael Jackson/Young Stevie Wonder	Raymond Luke Jr./Jaleel Battles Jr.	Reed L. Shannon/ Jaleel Battles Jr.	Eshan Gopal	Joshua Vaughan
Young Berry Gordy/Young Michael Jackson/Young Stevie Wonder	Leon Outlaw, Jr.	Leon Outlaw, Jr.	Kwame Kandekore	Keiran Edwards
Young Berry Gordy/Young Michael Jackson/Young Stevie Wonder			Joshua Tikare	Mickell Stewart-Grimes
Young Berry Gordy/Young Michael Jackson/Young Stevie Wonder				Yami Mirazi

== Musical numbers ==
The musical contains a total of 66 songs. The following song list is not the order of the songs in the production:

Songs in Motown: The Musical
Song	Original artist	Written by
"ABC"	The Jackson 5	Alphonso Mizell, Freddie Perren, Berry Gordy Jr., Deke Richards
"Ain't No Mountain High Enough"	Marvin Gaye and Tammi Terrell	Valerie Simpson, Nickolas Ashford
"Ain't Too Proud to Beg"	The Temptations	Norman Whitfield, Eddie Holland
"All Night Long (All Night)"	Lionel Richie	Lionel Richie
"Baby I Need Your Loving"	The Four Tops	Holland–Dozier–Holland
"Ball of Confusion (That's What the World Is Today)"	The Temptations	Norman Whitfield, Barrett Strong
"A Breathtaking Guy"	Smokey Robinson	Smokey Robinson
"Brick House"	The Commodores	Lionel Richie, Ronald LaPread, Walter Orange, Milan Williams, Thomas McClary, William King
"Buttered Popcorn"	The Supremes	Berry Gordy Jr., Barney Ales
"Bye Bye Baby"	Mary Wells	Mary Wells
"Can I Close the Door"	—N/a	Berry Gordy, Michael Lovesmith
"Come See About Me"	The Supremes	Holland–Dozier–Holland
"Cruisin'"	Smokey Robinson	Smokey Robinson, Marv Tarplin
"Dancing in the Street"	Martha and the Vandellas	Marvin Gaye, Ivy Jo Hunter, William "Mickey" Stevenson
"Do You Love Me"	The Contours	Berry Gordy
"Fingertips, Part 2"	Stevie Wonder	Clarence Paul, Henry Cosby
"For Once in My Life"	Jean DuShon	Orlando Murden, Ronald Miller
"Get Ready"	The Temptations	Smokey Robinson
"Give It to Me Baby"	Rick James	Rick James
"Good Morning Heartache"	Billie Holiday	Ervin Drake, Dan Fisher, Irene Higginbotham
"Got a Job"	—N/a	Smokey Robinson, Berry Gordy Jr., Billy Davis
"Hail to the Beat"	—N/a	Berry Gordy Jr., Michael Lovesmith
"The Happening"	The Supremes	Holland–Dozier–Holland, Frank De Vol
"Happy Birthday"	Stevie Wonder	Stevie Wonder
"Hey Joe (Black Like Me)"	—N/a	Berry Gordy Jr., Michael Lovesmith
"How High the Moon"	Two for the Show	Morgan Lewis, Nancy Hamilton
"I Can't Get Next to You"	The Temptations	Norman Whitfield, Barrett Strong
"I Can't Help Myself (Sugar Pie Honey Bunch)"	The Four Tops	Holland–Dozier–Holland
"I Got a Feeling"	The Four Tops	Holland–Dozier–Holland
"I Hear a Symphony"	The Supremes	Holland–Dozier–Holland
"I Heard It Through the Grapevine"	Gladys Knight & the Pips	Norman Whitfield, Barrett Strong
"(I Know) I'm Losing You"	The Temptations	Holland–Dozier–Holland
"I Want You Back"	The Jackson 5	Alphonso Mizell, Freddie Perren, Berry Gordy Jr., Deke Richards
"I'll Be There"	The Jackson 5	Holland–Dozier–Holland
"It's What's in the Grooves That Counts"	—N/a	Berry Gordy Jr., Michael Lovesmith
"Lonely Teardrops"	Jackie Wilson	Berry Gordy Jr., Gwen Gordy Fuqua, Billy Davis
"Love Child"	Diana Ross & The Supremes	R. Dean Taylor, Frank Wilson, Pam Sawyer and Richards
"Love Is Here and Now You're Gone"	The Supremes	Holland–Dozier–Holland
"The Love You Save"	The Jackson 5	Alphonso Mizell, Freddie Perren, Berry Gordy Jr., Deke Richards
"Mercy Mercy Me (The Ecology)"	Marvin Gaye	Marvin Gaye
"My Girl"	The Temptations	Smokey Robinson, Ronnie White
"My Guy"	Mary Wells	Smokey Robinson
"My Mama Done Told Me"	Dinah Shore	Berry Gordy Jr., Smokey Robinson, Billy Davis
"Please Mr. Postman"	The Marvelettes	William Garrett, Georgia Dobbins, B. Holland, Freddie Gorman, Robert Bateman
"Reach Out and Touch (Somebody's Hand)"	Diana Ross	Valerie Simpson, Nickolas Ashford
"Reach Out I'll Be There"	The Four Tops	Holland–Dozier–Holland
"Reet Petite"	Jackie Wilson	Berry Gordy Jr., Billy Davis
"Remember Me"	Diana Ross	Valerie Simpson, Nickolas Ashford
"Shop Around"	The Miracles	Berry Gordy Jr., Smokey Robinson
"Shotgun"	Jr. Walker & the All Stars	Junior Walker
"Signed, Sealed, Delivered I'm Yours"	Stevie Wonder	Stevie Wonder, Syreeta Wright, Lee Garrett, Lula Mae Hardaway
"Square Biz"	Teena Marie	Mary C. Brockert, Allen McGrier
"Stop! In the Name of Love"	The Supremes	Holland–Dozier–Holland
"Stubborn Kind of Fellow"	Marvin Gaye	Gaye, George Gordy, Stevenson
"Super Freak"	Rick James	Rick James
"The Tears of a Clown"	The Miracles	Stevie Wonder, Smokey Robinson, Henry Cosby
"To Be Loved"	—N/a	Berry Gordy Jr., Gwen Fuqua, Billy Davis
"Two Lovers"	Mary Wells	Smokey Robinson
"War"	Edwin Starr	Norman Whitfield, Barrett Strong
"What's Going On"	Marvin Gaye	Marvin Gaye, Renaldo Benson, Al Cleveland
"Where Did Our Love Go"	The Supremes	Holland–Dozier–Holland
"Who's Lovin' You"	Smokey Robinson	Smokey Robinson
"You Are You"	—N/a	Berry Gordy Jr.
"You're All I Need to Get By"	Marvin Gaye and Tammi Terrell	Valerie Simpson, Nickolas Ashford
"You're Nobody till Somebody Loves You"	Russ Morgan	Russ Morgan, James Cavanaugh, Larry Stock
"You've Really Got a Hold on Me"	The Miracles	Smokey Robinson

== Critical response ==
Charles Isherwood, in his review for The New York Times, wrote: "More than 50 songs...are performed in 'Motown,' usually, alas, in truncated versions. Most are simply presented as concert versions by the actors playing the artists who made them famous, but a few are shoehorned awkwardly into the story as 'book' songs.... Making way for so much music means that 'Motown' breezily scrimps on storytelling. Characters come and go so quickly we barely have time to register their famous names, let alone get to know them.... The performers put their songs across with verve and an admirable lack of self-consciousness, given that the audience is likely to be intimately familiar with every nuance of phrasing from the original recordings...."

The TheatreMania reviewer noted:

Rather than giving us a complex portrait on this fascinating businessman, the show's shoddily written book is essentially a self-serving theatrical memoir in which Gordy gets to tell his life story. But just as importantly, the piece also serves as a celebration of the music that brought America's black and white populations together in a way nothing else ever did. Perhaps that is why Gordy and his creative team, led by director Charles Randolph-Wright, seem so worried they left out an audience favorite that they crammed in more than 50 hits. The result is that too few of the beloved Motown classics receive the kind of full-scale, all-out renditions they deserve. An early, extended version of Martha & The Vandellas' 'Dancing in the Street' proves not just a high point (abetted by energetic choreography from Patricia Wilcox and Warren Adams), but a false promise of what lies ahead....The one person who truly shines, though, is Valisia LeKae as Gordy's longtime paramour, superstar Diana Ross. It's not just her almost spot-on re-creation of Miss Ross' breathy voice and steely demeanor that commands our attention. The consistent display of her genuine star power — most evident in a thrilling 'Reach Out and Touch' segment — also draws us in.
