= Big Fish =

2003 film by Tim Burton

- Theatrical release poster
- Directed by: Tim Burton
- Screenplay by: John August
- Based on: Big Fish: A Novel of Mythic Proportions by Daniel Wallace
- Produced by: Richard D. Zanuck; Bruce Cohen; Dan Jinks
- Starring: Ewan McGregor; Albert Finney; Billy Crudup; Jessica Lange; Helena Bonham Carter; Alison Lohman; Robert Guillaume; Marion Cotillard; Steve Buscemi; Danny DeVito
- Cinematography: Philippe Rousselot
- Edited by: Chris Lebenzon
- Music by: Danny Elfman
- Production companies: Columbia Pictures; Jinks/Cohen Company; The Zanuck Company
- Distributed by: Sony Pictures Releasing
- Release dates: December 4, 2003 (Hammerstein Ballroom); December 10, 2003 (United States)
- Running time: 125 minutes
- Country: United States
- Language: English
- Budget: $70 million
- Box office: $123.2 million

Big Fish is a 2003 American fantasy drama film directed by Tim Burton. It is based on the 1998 novel Big Fish: A Novel of Mythic Proportions by Daniel Wallace. The film stars Ewan McGregor, Albert Finney, Billy Crudup, Jessica Lange, Helena Bonham Carter, Alison Lohman, Robert Guillaume, Marion Cotillard, Steve Buscemi, and Danny DeVito. It tells the story of a frustrated son who tries to distinguish fact from fiction in the life of his father, a teller of tall tales.

The film's screenwriter, John August, read a manuscript of the novel six months before it was published and convinced Columbia Pictures to acquire the rights. He began adapting the novel as a screenplay while producers negotiated with Steven Spielberg about directing the film; Spielberg eventually left the project to focus on Catch Me If You Can (2002). Tim Burton and Richard D. Zanuck took over after completing Planet of the Apes (2001), and brought McGregor and Finney on board.

The film's theme of reconciliation between a dying father and his son had special significance for Burton, whose father had died in 2000. Big Fish was shot on location in Alabama in a series of fairy tale vignettes with a Southern Gothic aesthetic. The film premiered on December 4, 2003 in Manhattan. It was released in limited capacity on December 10, followed by a wide release on January 9, 2004. The film received positive reviews from critics and grossed $123 million worldwide. It also received various award nominations, including seven BAFTA nominations, four Golden Globe nominations and two Saturn Award nominations. It also received an Academy Award nomination and a Grammy Award nomination for Danny Elfman's original score. A musical adaptation of Big Fish premiered in Chicago in April 2013.

== Plot ==
At William Bloom's wedding party, his father Edward recalls the day Will was born, claiming he caught an enormous catfish using his wedding ring as bait. Will has heard his father's fanciful tales many times, and believes they are lies. Fed up by the stories, Will has a falling out with his father. Three years later, Edward is diagnosed with cancer, prompting Will and his pregnant wife Joséphine to spend time with him in Alabama.

Edward's life is chronicled through flashbacks, beginning with his boyhood encounter with a witch. She shows Edward how he will die, which does not faze him. As he reaches adulthood, he finds his hometown too confining, and sets out into the world. He meets a giant named Karl, and they begin traveling together. When they find a fork in the road, they take separate paths. Edward traverses a swamp and discovers the hidden town of Spectre, where he befriends the poet Norther Winslow and the mayor's young daughter, Jenny. Not ready to settle down, Edward leaves Spectre, but makes a promise to Jenny that he will return.

At Joséphine's request, the bed-ridden Edward tells her how he met his wife, Sandra. In more flashbacks, Edward and Karl visit the Calloway Circus, where Edward falls in love with a beautiful woman. Edward and Karl get jobs in the circus, and the ringmaster Amos Calloway reveals to Edward one detail about the woman each month. Three years later, Edward discovers that Amos is a werewolf, but shows no ill will towards him. In gratitude, Amos reveals the woman's name as Sandra Templeton. Edward confesses his love to Sandra, but she rebuffs him despite his romantic gestures. Sandra's fiancé, Don Price, beats Edward up, which prompts Sandra to break off their engagement and marry Edward instead.

In more flashbacks, Edward is conscripted into the army and fights in the Korean War. He parachutes into the middle of a North Korean military show, steals important documents, and persuades the conjoined twins Ping and Jing (Note: During flashback scenes, Edward describes Ping and Jing as "Siamese twins". In these scenes they are depicted as conjoined twins, a reference to the real-life Thai conjoined twin performers Chang and Eng Bunker. In the funeral scene at the film's conclusion, Ping and Jing are depicted as twins who are not conjoined.) to help him escape in exchange for making them celebrities. Sandra receives news that Edward is missing in action, but joyfully reunites with him when he makes his way home months later.

Edward becomes a traveling salesman and one day unexpectedly runs into Norther Winslow, who is now a criminal. He forces Edward to assist him in robbing a bank, but is disappointed by how little money is in the vault. Edward inspires him to instead pursue a financial career on Wall Street. After he becomes wealthy, Norther thanks Edward by sending him a check for $10,000, which Edward uses to buy a house for his family.

In the present, Will investigates the truth behind his father's tales. He meets Jenny, now a divorced middle-aged piano teacher, and she explains that Edward rescued Spectre from bankruptcy and rebuilt it with help from his circus friends. Jenny reveals that although she loved Edward, he remained loyal to Sandra.

Edward has a stroke and Will visits him at the hospital. Unable to speak much, he asks Will to narrate how his life ends. Will tells his father a fantastical tale of their daring escape from the hospital. They arrive at the banks of a lake, where everyone from Edward's stories has gathered to see him off. Will carries his father into the river, where he transforms into a giant catfish and swims away. Satisfied by Will's story, Edward dies peacefully. At the funeral, Will and Joséphine are surprised to see all the people from Edward's stories, although they appear less fantastical. Later, Will passes on Edward's stories to his children.

== Cast ==
- Ewan McGregor as Edward Bloom (young)
  - Albert Finney as Edward Bloom (senior)
  - Perry Walston as Edward Bloom (age 10)
- Billy Crudup as Will Bloom
  - Grayson Stone as Will Bloom (age 6–8)
- Jessica Lange as Sandra Bloom (senior)
  - Alison Lohman as Sandra Bloom (young), née Templeton
- Helena Bonham Carter as Jenny (young & senior) / The Witch
  - Hailey Anne Nelson as Jenny (age 8)
- Robert Guillaume as Dr. Bennett (senior)
- Marion Cotillard as Joséphine
- Matthew McGrory as Karl the Giant
- David Denman as Don Price (age 18–22)
  - John Lowell as Donald "Don" Price (age 12)
- Missi Pyle as Mildred
- Loudon Wainwright III as Beamen
- Ada Tai and Arlene Tai as Ping and Jing
- Steve Buscemi as Norther Winslow
- Danny DeVito as Amos Calloway
- Deep Roy as Mr. Soggybottom
- R. Keith Harris as Ed's Father
- Karla Droege as Ed's Mother
- Zachary Gardner as Zacky Price (age 10)
- Darrell Vanterpool as Wilbur (age 10)
- Miley Cyrus (Note: Credited as Destiny Cyrus) as Ruthie (age 8)
- Joseph Humphrey as Little Brave
- Billy Redden as Banjo Man
- Russell Hodgkinson as Some Farmer
- Daniel Wallace as Econ. Professor
- George McArthur as Colossus
- Bevin Kaye as River Woman

== Production ==
=== Development ===
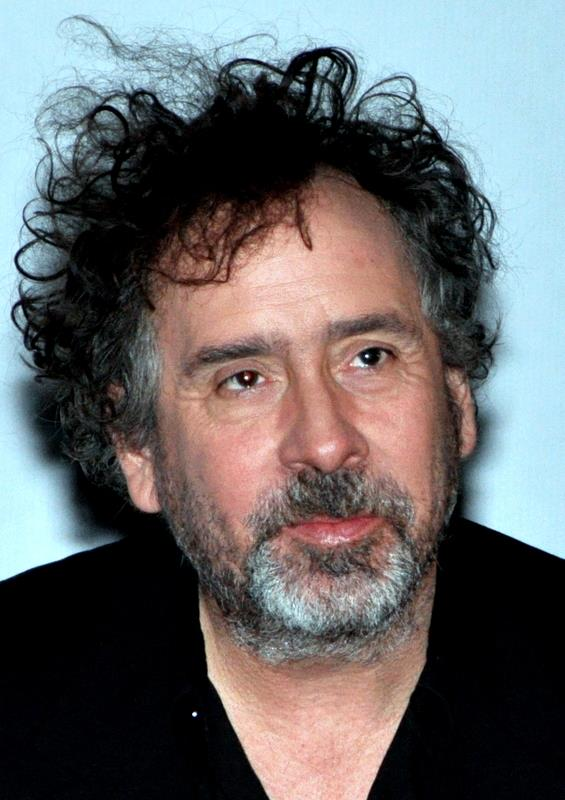
Director Tim Burton, pictured in 2012

About six months before it was published, the screenwriter John August read a manuscript of the 1998 novel Big Fish: A Novel of Mythic Proportions by Daniel Wallace. In September 1998, August convinced Columbia Pictures to acquire the film rights on his behalf. He worked hard to turn the episodic book into a cohesive screenplay, which he decided needed multiple narrators. In August 2000, the producers Bruce Cohen and Dan Jinks began discussions for Steven Spielberg to direct the film. Spielberg planned to have DreamWorks co-finance and distribute Big Fish with Columbia, and intended to start filming in late 2001, after completing Minority Report (2002).

Spielberg courted Jack Nicholson for the role of the older Edward Bloom. He felt that the script did not give Nicholson enough to do, so he asked August to write new sequences. Spielberg eventually left Big Fish when he became involved with Catch Me If You Can (2002), and DreamWorks also backed out of the project. With Spielberg no longer involved, August and the producers restored the script to its previous version. Spielberg later admitted that he made a mistake by asking August to alter the screenplay. August took his favorite elements from the previous drafts and came up with what he called "a best-of Big Fish script". August, Jinks and Cohen considered Stephen Daldry as a potential director before deciding to approach Tim Burton. At this point, August felt the script was the best it had ever been.

Burton had just finished directing the big-budget film Planet of the Apes (2001) and was ready for a smaller-scale project. He liked the Big Fish screenplay, feeling that it was the first unique story he had been offered since Beetlejuice (1988). The script's combination of an emotional drama with exaggerated tall tales allowed him to tell multiple stories of different genres, which he enjoyed. Burton's father had died recently, and he found that he could process emotions related to his father's death by making the film. He signed on to direct in April 2002, which prompted Richard D. Zanuck, who worked with Burton on Planet of the Apes, to join Big Fish as a producer.

=== Casting ===
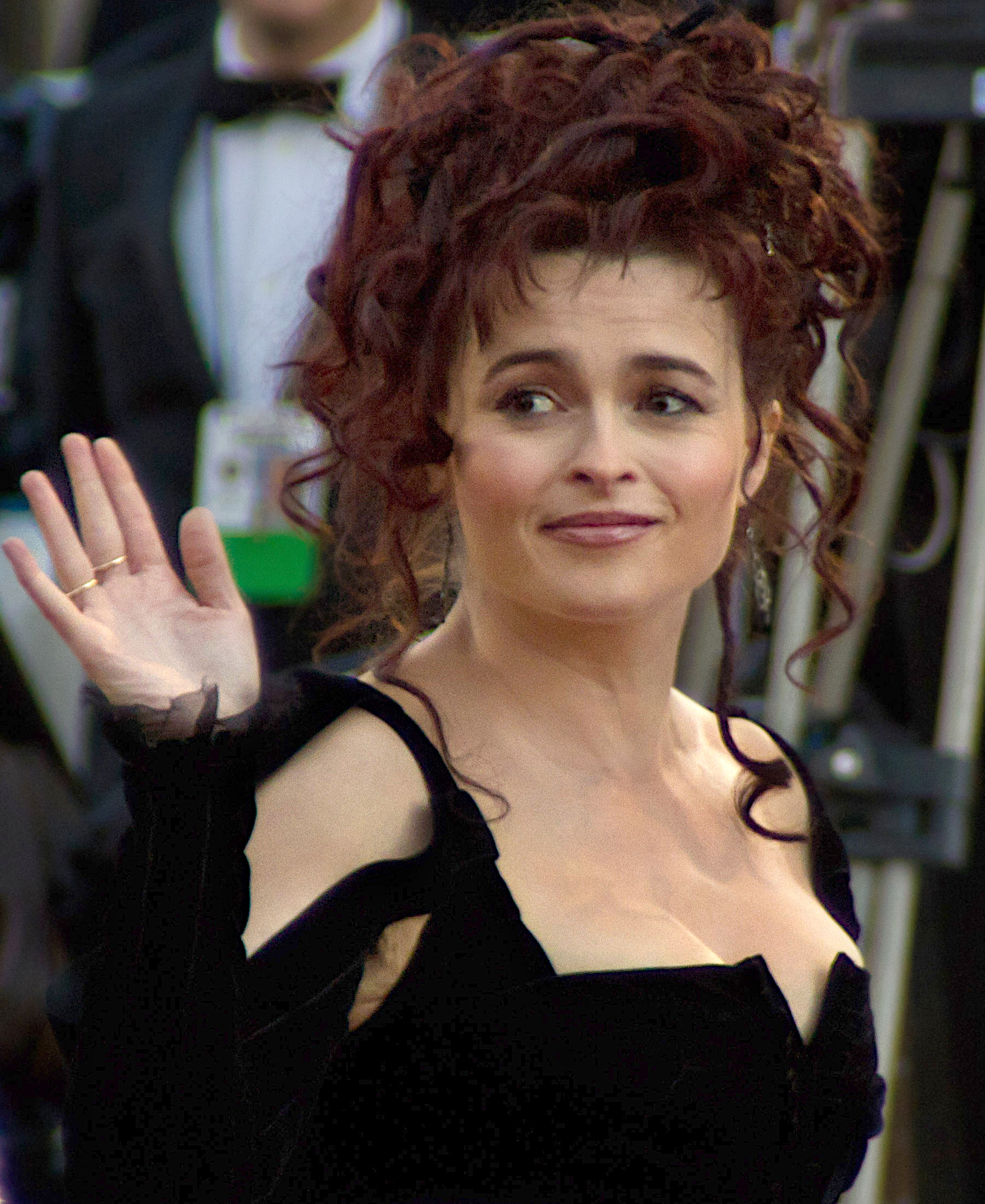
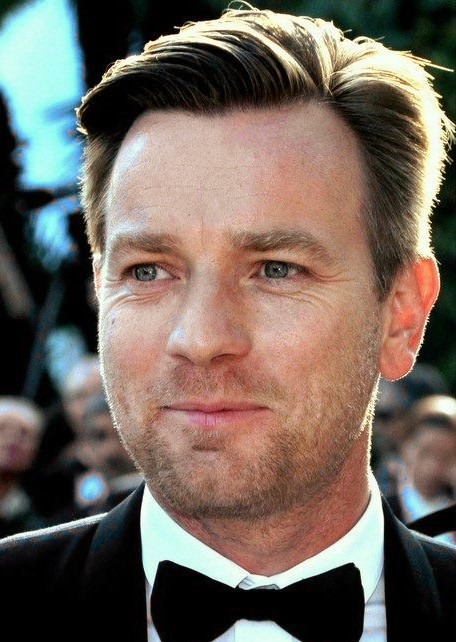
Helena Bonham Carter (left, pictured in 2011) and Ewan McGregor (2012)

For the role of Edward Bloom, Burton spoke with Jack Nicholson, Spielberg's initial choice for the role. Burton had previously worked with Nicholson on Batman (1989) and Mars Attacks! (1996). In order to depict Nicholson as the young Edward, Burton intended to use a combination of computer-generated imagery and prosthetic makeup. Jinks and Cohen, who were working with Ewan McGregor on Down with Love (2003) at the time, suggested that Burton cast both McGregor and Albert Finney for Edward. After viewing Finney's performance in Tom Jones (1963), Burton observed similarities between him and McGregor, and coincidentally found a People magazine article comparing the two. The Scottish McGregor found it easier to perform Edward's Southern American accent than a standard American accent. He said of the Southern accent: "[Y]ou can really hear it. You can get your teeth into it. Standard American is much harder."

A process of dual casting also applied to the role of Edward's wife, Sandra, who would be played by Jessica Lange and Alison Lohman. Both Burton and Zanuck had been impressed with Lohman's performance in White Oleander (2002), and felt she was the ideal candidate for the role. Burton's girlfriend, Helena Bonham Carter, was cast in two roles: Jenny and the Witch. Her prosthetic makeup for the Witch took five hours to apply. She was pregnant during filming and experienced morning sickness, which was exacerbated by the fumes from the makeup.

Burton personalized the film with several cameos. While filming in Alabama, the crew tracked down Billy Redden, one of the banjo players from Deliverance (1972). Redden was a co-owner of a restaurant in Clayton, Georgia, and he agreed to appear in the Spectre sequence. As Edward first enters the town, Redden can be seen on a porch plucking a few notes from "Dueling Banjos". Daniel Wallace makes a brief appearance as Sandra's economics teacher.

=== Filming ===
Both costumes and CGI were used to create the effect of conjoined twins.

Principal photography began on January 13, 2003. Big Fish was shot entirely in Alabama except for one week of filming in Paris in May. Most of the Alabama scenes were shot in Wetumpka and Montgomery. Some filming also took place in Tallassee and on the campus of Huntingdon College. Scenes in the town of Spectre were filmed on a custom-built set on Jackson Lake Island. Principal photography continued until the first week of April and is estimated to have generated as much as $25 million for the local economy. The Spectre set can still be found at its original location.

Burton filmed all the hospital scenes and most of Finney's scenes first, before moving on to McGregor's scenes. Scenes with the giant Karl were created using forced perspective filmmaking. Helena Bonham Carter's prosthetic makeup was designed by Stan Winston Studios, which also created animatronics for the production. Flooding on the set interrupted filming of the circus scenes for several weeks, but Burton managed to deliver the film on budget and on schedule.

=== Post-production ===
Although Burton limited the use of digital effects in Big Fish, he employed color grading to achieve a Southern Gothic aesthetic. The film's musical score was composed by Burton's frequent collaborator Danny Elfman, and Burton asked Pearl Jam to record an original song for the closing credits. After viewing an early print of the film, the group's vocalist Eddie Vedder wrote the song "Man of the Hour". He completed a demo within a day, and the band recorded the song four days later. Pearl Jam's guitarist Mike McCready stated, "We were so blown away by the movie ... Eddie and I were standing around talking about it afterwards and were teary-eyed. We were so emotionally charged and moved by the imagination and humanity."

== Release ==
The world premiere of Big Fish took place on December 4, 2003, at the Hammerstein Ballroom in Manhattan. Columbia Pictures had initially planned a November wide release for the film in the United States, but ultimately decided on a December 10 limited release. The US wide release occurred on January 9, 2004, with the film appearing in 2,406 theaters and earning $13.8 million in its opening weekend. It eventually grossed $66.8 million in the United States and $56.1 million in other countries, for a total of $122.9 million worldwide.

=== Critical response ===
On the review aggregator Rotten Tomatoes, 76% of critics have positively reviewed Big Fish, giving it an average score of 7.2/10. The website's consensus states: "A charming father-and-son tale filled with typical Tim Burton flourishes, Big Fish is an impressive catch." Metacritic calculates an average score of 58/100 based on 42 reviews, indicating "mixed or average" reviews. Audiences polled by CinemaScore gave the film an average grade of "B+" on an A+ to F scale.

In his review of the film, Owen Gleiberman of Entertainment Weekly called Big Fish "a wide-eyed Southern Gothic picaresque in which each lunatic twist of a development is more enchanting than the last." Peter Travers of Rolling Stone praised Burton's directing and described the film as a touching father-son drama and a celebration of the art of storytelling. Mike Clark of USA Today applauded the casting choices. He called the evolution of Alison Lohman's character into an older woman "delightful" and "a metamorphosis to equal any in screen history." Gleiberman, Travers and Clark all compared Big Fish to Forrest Gump (1994).

James Berardinelli found the film's fairy tale approach reminiscent of The Princess Bride (1987) and the films of Terry Gilliam. He called the film "a clever, smart fantasy that targets the child inside every adult, without insulting the intelligence of either." In a mixed review, Roger Ebert wrote, "[T]here is no denying that Will has a point: The old man is a blowhard. There is a point at which his stories stop working as entertainment and segue into sadism." Richard Corliss of Time magazine was disappointed, finding the father-son reconciliation storyline to be cliché. Referencing the fable The Boy Who Cried Wolf, Corliss called Edward Bloom "the man who cried fish." Slant Magazine ranked Big Fish as the 85th best film of the decade 2000–2010.

=== Accolades ===
Award	Category	Recipient	Result
Academy Awards	Best Original Score	Danny Elfman	Nominated
BAFTA Awards	Best Film		Nominated
BAFTA Awards	Best Direction	Tim Burton	Nominated
BAFTA Awards	Best Actor in a Supporting Role	Albert Finney	Nominated
BAFTA Awards	Best Adapted Screenplay	John August	Nominated
BAFTA Awards	Best Makeup and Hair	Jean Ann Black and Paul LeBlanc	Nominated
BAFTA Awards	Best Production Design	Dennis Gassner	Nominated
BAFTA Awards	Best Visual Effects	Kevin Scott Mack, Seth Maury, Lindsay MacGowan, Paddy Eason	Nominated
Golden Globe Awards	Best Motion Picture - Musical or Comedy		Nominated
Golden Globe Awards	Best Supporting Actor	Albert Finney	Nominated
Golden Globe Awards	Best Original Score	Danny Elfman	Nominated
Golden Globe Awards	Best Original Song	Pearl Jam; For "Man of the Hour"	Nominated
Grammy Awards	Best Score for a Motion Picture	Danny Elfman	Nominated
Saturn Awards	Best Fantasy Film		Nominated
Saturn Awards	Best Actor	Albert Finney	Nominated
AARP Movies for Grownups Awards	Best Actor	Albert Finney	Nominated
Argentinean Film Critics Association Awards	Best Foreign Film, Not in the Spanish Language	Tim Burton	Nominated
Awards Circuit Community Awards	Best Actor in a Supporting Role	Albert Finney	Nominated
Awards Circuit Community Awards	Best Adapted Screenplay	John August	Nominated
Awards Circuit Community Awards	Best Cinematography	Philippe Rousselot	Nominated
Awards Circuit Community Awards	Best Original Score	Danny Elfman	Nominated
Awards Circuit Community Awards	Best Visual Effects		Nominated
Broadcast Film Critics Association Awards	Best Picture		Nominated
Broadcast Film Critics Association Awards	Best Director	Tim Burton	Nominated
Broadcast Film Critics Association Awards	Best Writer	John August	Nominated
Broadcast Film Critics Association Awards	Best Composer	Danny Elfman	Nominated
Broadcast Film Critics Association Awards	Best Song	Eddie Vedder	Nominated
Casting Society of America Awards	Best Casting for Feature Film, Drama	Denise Chamian	Nominated

=== Home media ===
The Region 1 DVD was released on April 27, 2004, and Region 2 was released on June 7. The DVD contains seven featurettes and an audio commentary track by Tim Burton. A special edition was released on November 1, 2005, with a 24-page hardback book titled Fairy Tale for a Grown Up. The film was released on Blu-ray on March 20, 2007.

== Thematic analysis ==
Big Fish is about what's real and what's fantastic, what's true and what's not true, what's partially true and how, in the end, it's all true.

— Tim Burton

The reconciliation between father and son has been called the central theme in Big Fish. Daniel Wallace's interest in the theme began with his own family. He described Edward as similar to his own father, who used charm to keep his distance from people. In the film, Will believes his father has never been honest with him, using extravagant myths about his past to hide himself. Wallace said that Edward and Will each undertake their own quest in the film. Edward's quest is "to be a big fish in a big pond" while Will's quest is to see through his father's tall tales."

John August identified with Will's character and modeled it after himself. Like Will, August had attempted to get to know his father before his death, but found it difficult. Both Will and August were 28 years old and had studied journalism. In the film, Will says, "I didn't see anything of myself in my father, and I don't think he saw anything of himself in me. We were like strangers who knew each other very well." Will's description of his relationship with Edward closely resembled August's relationship with his own father. Burton also used the film to explore his emotions about the death of his father. He said, "My father had been ill for a while ... I tried to get in touch with him, to have, like in this film, some sort of resolution, but it was impossible."

The film scholar Kent L. Brintnall claimed that the father-son relationship resolves itself at the end of Big Fish. He suggested that as Edward dies, Will lets go of his anger and begins to understand his father for the first time. Brintnall called Will's willingness to finish his father's story a "gesture of love and comprehension" and an "act of communion and care". Brintnall asserted that Will comes to understand that Edward's stories "gave him a reality and substance ... that was as real, genuine, and deep as the day-to-day experiences that Will sought out".
