= List of accolades received by Milk (film) =

Accolades for the film Milk

Milk had received accolades from several film critics organizations.

- December 2, 2008, the film received 4 nominations for the 24th Independent Spirit Awards and won 2, including Best Supporting Male (James Franco) and Best First Screenplay (Dustin Lance Black).
- December 9, 2008, the film received eight Critic's Choice Award nominations, including Best Picture and Best Director.
- December 11, 2008, Sean Penn received one Golden Globe nomination for Best Actor, the film's only nomination.
- December 18, 2008, the Screen Actors Guild nominated Milk on three categories: Best Actor, Best Supporting Actor and Best Cast in a Motion Picture for the 15th Screen Actors Guild Awards; Sean Penn was chosen as Best Actor.
- January 5, 2009, the film's producers received a nomination for Producer of the Year for the 20th Producers Guild of America Awards.
- January 8, 2009, Gus Van Sant received a nomination for Outstanding Directorial Achievement for the 61st Directors Guild of America Awards.
- The film won Best Original Screenplay at the 62nd Writers Guild of America Awards
- The film received four BAFTA award nominations, including Best Film, for the 62nd British Academy Film Awards.
- January 22, 2009 the film received 8 Academy Award nominations, including Best Picture, and winning two for Best Original Screenplay and Best Actor in a Leading Role (Sean Penn).

Award	Category	Name	Outcome
81st Academy Awards	Best Picture	Dan Jinks and Bruce Cohen	Nominated
81st Academy Awards	Best Director	Gus Van Sant	Nominated
81st Academy Awards	Best Actor	Sean Penn	Won
81st Academy Awards	Best Supporting Actor	Josh Brolin	Nominated
81st Academy Awards	Best Original Screenplay	Dustin Lance Black	Won
81st Academy Awards	Best Costume Design	Danny Glicker	Nominated
81st Academy Awards	Best Film Editing	Elliot Graham	Nominated
81st Academy Awards	Best Original Score	Danny Elfman	Nominated
59th American Cinema Editors Eddie Awards	Best Edited Feature Film, Dramatic	Elliot Graham	Nominated
American Film Institute	Top 10 Outstanding Movies of the Year		Won
13th Art Directors Guild Awards	Excellence in Production Design in a Period Film	Bill Groom	Nominated
4th Austin Film Critics Association Awards	Top 10 Films		3rd Place
4th Austin Film Critics Association Awards	Best Actor	Sean Penn	Won
28th Boston Society of Film Critics Awards	Best Director	Gus Van Sant	Won
28th Boston Society of Film Critics Awards	Best Actor	Sean Penn	Won
28th Boston Society of Film Critics Awards	Best Screenplay	Dustin Lance Black	Won
14th BFCA Critic's Choice Awards	Best Picture	Dan Jinks, Bruce Cohen	Nominated
14th BFCA Critic's Choice Awards	Best Director	Gus Van Sant	Nominated
14th BFCA Critic's Choice Awards	Best Actor	Sean Penn	Won
14th BFCA Critic's Choice Awards	Best Supporting Actor	Josh Brolin	Nominated
14th BFCA Critic's Choice Awards	Best Supporting Actor	James Franco	Nominated
14th BFCA Critic's Choice Awards	Best Writer	Dustin Lance Black	Nominated
14th BFCA Critic's Choice Awards	Best Composer	Danny Elfman	Nominated
14th BFCA Critic's Choice Awards	Best Acting Ensemble		Won
62nd British Academy Film Awards	Best Film	Dan Jinks, Bruce Cohen	Nominated
62nd British Academy Film Awards	Best Actor in a Leading Role	Sean Penn	Nominated
62nd British Academy Film Awards	Best Original Screenplay	Dustin Lance Black	Nominated
62nd British Academy Film Awards	Best Makeup and Hair	Steven E. Anderson, Michael White	Nominated
34th César Awards	Best Foreign Film	Gus Van Sant	Nominated
21st Chicago Film Critics Association Awards	Best Picture	Dan Jinks, Bruce Cohen	Nominated
21st Chicago Film Critics Association Awards	Best Director	Gus Van Sant	Nominated
21st Chicago Film Critics Association Awards	Best Actor	Sean Penn	Nominated
21st Chicago Film Critics Association Awards	Best Original Screenplay	Dustin Lance Black	Nominated
21st Chicago Film Critics Association Awards	Best Original Score	Danny Elfman	Nominated
11th Costume Designers Guild Awards	Excellence in Period Costume Design for Film	Danny Glicker	Nominated
15th Dallas-Fort Worth Film Critics Association Awards	Top 10 Films		2nd Place
15th Dallas-Fort Worth Film Critics Association Awards	Best Film	Dan Jinks, Bruce Cohen	Runner-up
15th Dallas-Fort Worth Film Critics Association Awards	Best Director	Gus Van Sant	Nominated
15th Dallas-Fort Worth Film Critics Association Awards	Best Actor	Sean Penn	Won
15th Dallas-Fort Worth Film Critics Association Awards	Best Supporting Actor	Josh Brolin	Runner-up
15th Dallas-Fort Worth Film Critics Association Awards	Best Screenplay	Dustin Lance Black	Won
2nd Detroit Film Critics Society Awards	Best Actor	Sean Penn	Nominated
61st Directors Guild of America Awards	Outstanding Directorial Achievement in Feature Film	Gus Van Sant	Nominated
20th GLAAD Media Awards	Outstanding Film, Wide Release		Won
66th Golden Globe Awards	Best Performance by an Actor in a Leading Role, Motion Picture Drama	Sean Penn	Nominated
2nd Houston Film Critics Society Awards	Best Actor	Sean Penn	Won
24th Independent Spirit Awards	Best Male Lead	Sean Penn	Nominated
24th Independent Spirit Awards	Best Supporting Male	James Franco	Won
24th Independent Spirit Awards	Best First Screenplay	Dustin Lance Black	Won
24th Independent Spirit Awards	Best Cinematography	Harris Savides	Nominated
5th International Film Music Critics Association Awards	Best Original Score for a Drama Film	Danny Elfman	Nominated
29th London Film Critics Circle	Best Film of the Year	Dan Jinks, Bruce Cohen	Nominated
29th London Film Critics Circle	Best Director of the Year	Gus Van Sant	Nominated
29th London Film Critics Circle	Best Actor of the Year	Sean Penn	Nominated
34th Los Angeles Film Critics Association Awards	Best Actor	Sean Penn	Won
56th Motion Picture Sound Editors Golden Reel Awards	Best Sound Editing, Dialogue and ADR in a Feature Film	Robert Jackson	Nominated
80th National Board of Review Awards	Top 10 Films		Nominated
80th National Board of Review Awards	Best Supporting Actor	Josh Brolin	Won
43rd National Society of Film Critics Awards	Best Actor	Sean Penn	Won
43rd National Society of Film Critics Awards	Best Director	Gus Van Sant	Runner-up
74th New York Film Critics Circle Awards	Best Picture	Dan Jinks, Bruce Cohen	Won
74th New York Film Critics Circle Awards	Best Actor	Sean Penn	Won
74th New York Film Critics Circle Awards	Best Supporting Actor	Josh Brolin	Won
8th New York Film Critics Online Awards	Top 10 Films		Won
8th New York Film Critics Online Awards	Best Actor	Sean Penn	Won
8th New York Film Critics Online Awards	Best Ensemble		Won
3rd Oklahoma Film Critics Circle Awards	Top 10 Films		Won
3rd Oklahoma Film Critics Circle Awards	Best Original Screenplay	Dustin Lance Black	Won
9th Phoenix Film Critics Society Awards	Top 10 Films		Nominated
9th Phoenix Film Critics Society Awards	Best Performance by an Actor in a Lead Role	Sean Penn	Won
9th Phoenix Film Critics Society Awards	Best Acting Ensemble		Won
20th Producers Guild of America Awards	Producer of the Year Award in Theatrical Motion Pictures	Dan Jinks, Bruce Cohen	Nominated
20th Producers Guild of America Awards	Stanley Kramer Award	Dan Jinks, Bruce Cohen	Won
5th St. Louis Gateway Film Critics Association Awards	Best Picture	Dan Jinks, Bruce Cohen	Nominated
5th St. Louis Gateway Film Critics Association Awards	Best Director	Gus Van Sant	Nominated
5th St. Louis Gateway Film Critics Association Awards	Best Actor	Sean Penn	Won
5th St. Louis Gateway Film Critics Association Awards	Best Supporting Actor	Josh Brolin	Nominated
5th St. Louis Gateway Film Critics Association Awards	Best Cinematography	Harris Savides	Nominated
5th St. Louis Gateway Film Critics Association Awards	Best Screenplay	Dustin Lance Black	Nominated
7th San Francisco Film Critics Awards	Best Picture	Dan Jinks, Bruce Cohen	Won
7th San Francisco Film Critics Awards	Best Director	Gus Van Sant	Won
7th San Francisco Film Critics Awards	Best Actor	Sean Penn	Won
7th San Francisco Film Critics Awards	Best Original Screenplay	Dustin Lance Black	Won
13th Satellite Awards	Best Motion Picture, Drama	Dan Jinks, Bruce Cohen	Nominated
13th Satellite Awards	Best Director	Gus Van Sant	Nominated
13th Satellite Awards	Best Actor in a Leading Role	Sean Penn	Nominated
13th Satellite Awards	Best Actor in a Supporting Role	James Franco	Nominated
13th Satellite Awards	Best Original Screenplay	Dustin Lance Black	Nominated
13th Satellite Awards	Best Original Score	Danny Elfman	Nominated
15th Screen Actors Guild Awards	Outstanding Performance by a Cast in a Motion Picture		Nominated
15th Screen Actors Guild Awards	Outstanding Performance by a Male Actor in a Leading Role, Motion Picture	Sean Penn	Won
15th Screen Actors Guild Awards	Outstanding Performance by a Male Actor in a Supporting Role, Motion Picture	Josh Brolin	Nominated
23rd Society of Camera Operators Awards	Camera Operator of the Year	Will Arnot	Nominated
17th Southeastern Film Critics Association Awards	Best Picture	Dan Jinks, Bruce Cohen	Won
17th Southeastern Film Critics Association Awards	Best Director	Gus Van Sant	Runner-up
17th Southeastern Film Critics Association Awards	Best Actor	Sean Penn	Won
17th Southeastern Film Critics Association Awards	Best Original Screenplay	Dustin Lance Black	Won
12th Toronto Film Critics Association Awards	Best Actor	Sean Penn	Runner-up
12th Toronto Film Critics Association Awards	Best Supporting Actor	Josh Brolin	Runner-up
9th Vancouver Film Critics Circle Awards	Best Film	Dan Jinks, Bruce Cohen	Won
9th Vancouver Film Critics Circle Awards	Best Director	Gus Van Sant	Nominated
9th Vancouver Film Critics Circle Awards	Best Actor	Sean Penn	Won
9th Vancouver Film Critics Circle Awards	Best Supporting Actor	Josh Brolin	Nominated
7th Washington D.C. Area Film Critics Association Awards	Best Film	Dan Jinks, Bruce Cohen	Nominated
7th Washington D.C. Area Film Critics Association Awards	Best Director	Gus Van Sant	Nominated
7th Washington D.C. Area Film Critics Association Awards	Best Actor	Sean Penn	Nominated
7th Washington D.C. Area Film Critics Association Awards	Best Supporting Actor	Josh Brolin	Nominated
7th Washington D.C. Area Film Critics Association Awards	Best Original Screenplay	Dustin Lance Black	Nominated
7th Washington D.C. Area Film Critics Association Awards	Best Ensemble		Nominated
61st Writers Guild of America Awards	Best Original Screenplay	Dustin Lance Black	Won
61st Writers Guild of America Awards	Paul Selvin Award	Dustin Lance Black	Won
