= Craig Mazin =

American screenwriter and film director

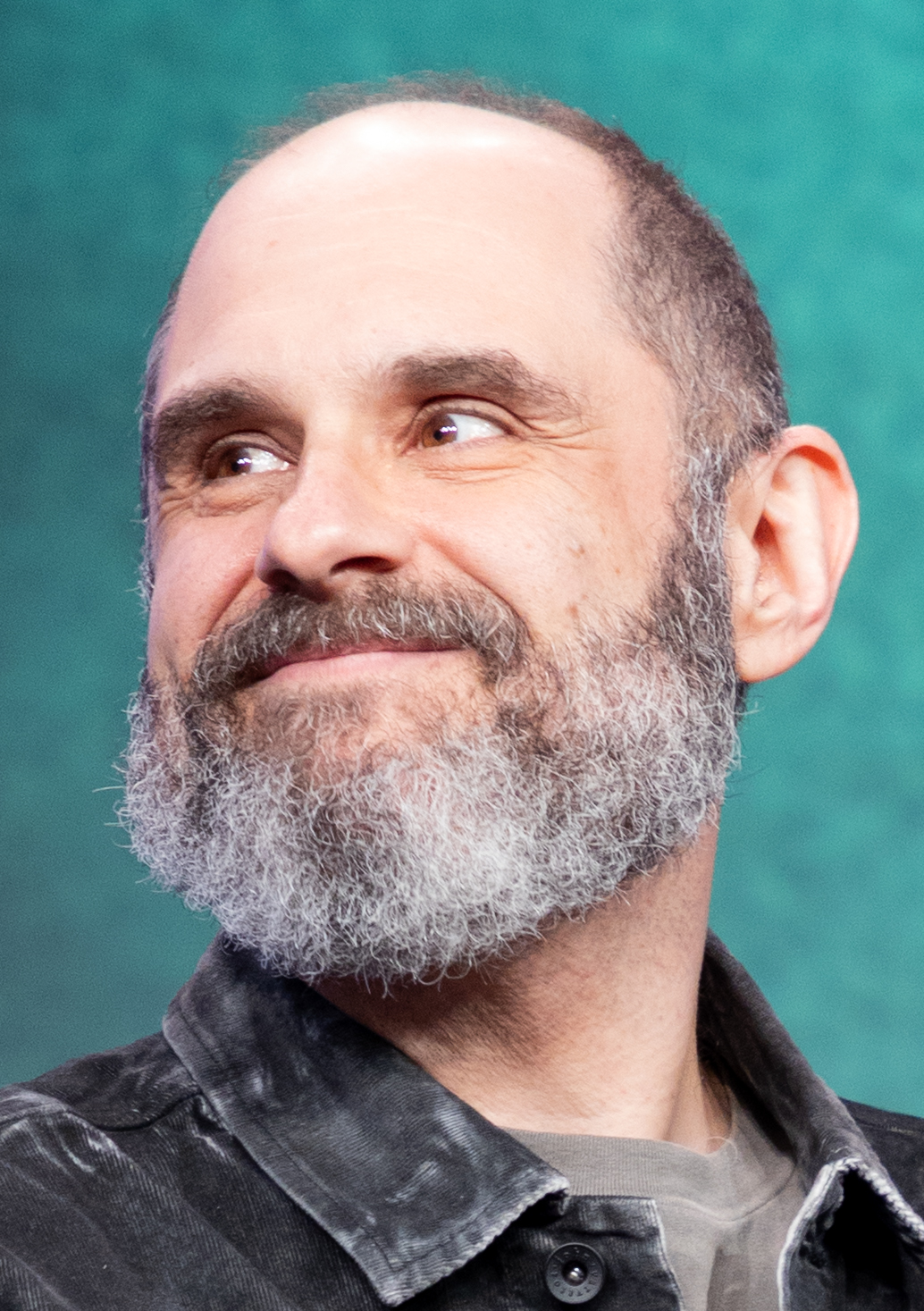
- Mazin at the 2025 SXSW
- Born: April 8, 1971 (age 55); New York City, New York, U.S.
- Education: Princeton University (BA)
- Occupations: Writer; director; producer
- Years active: 1997–present
- Spouse: Melissa Mazin
- Children: 2

Craig Mazin (born April 8, 1971) is an American filmmaker. He is best known for creating, writing, and producing the HBO historical disaster drama miniseries Chernobyl (2019) and co-creating, co-writing, and executive producing the HBO post-apocalyptic drama series The Last of Us (2023–present), the latter alongside Naughty Dog studio head Neil Druckmann. For the former, he won Primetime Emmy Awards for Outstanding Writing and Outstanding Limited Series.

Prior to his dramatic work, Mazin was primarily known for his work on comedy films such as Scary Movie 3 (2003), Scary Movie 4 (2006), Superhero Movie (2008), The Hangover Part II (2011), The Hangover Part III, and Identity Thief (both 2013).

== Early life ==
Craig Mazin was born on April 8, 1971, to Ashkenazi Jewish parents. He grew up in the city's Staten Island borough. He moved as a teenager to Marlboro Township, New Jersey, where he attended Freehold High School in nearby Freehold Borough. The school later inducted him into its Hall of Fame in 2010. He graduated magna cum laude with a degree in psychology from Princeton University in 1992. His roommate during his freshman year was future Republican politician Ted Cruz, whom he has since described as a "huge asshole".

== Career ==
Mazin began his entertainment career as a marketing executive with Walt Disney Pictures in the mid-1990s, where he was responsible for writing and producing campaigns for studio films. He made his screenwriting debut with 1997's sci-fi comedy RocketMan, co-written with his then-writing partner Greg Erb. He has since written movies such as Senseless, Scary Movie 3, Scary Movie 4, and Identity Thief. He has directed two films: 2000's low-budget superhero film The Specials, which he also produced, and the 2008 superhero spoof Superhero Movie, which he also wrote (he also made a cameo appearance as a janitor).

Since 2006, Mazin has collaborated with director Todd Phillips on several occasions. He co-wrote both Hangover sequels, The Hangover Part II and The Hangover Part III, and executive produced School for Scoundrels. In 2004, he was elected to the board of directors of the Writers Guild of America, West. He did not seek re-election and his term expired in September 2006. Along with fellow former WGA board member Ted Elliott, Mazin ran a website called The Artful Writer, which focused on issues relevant to working screenwriters. It closed in 2011 after seven years. In 2011, Mazin and fellow screenwriter John August began Scriptnotes, a weekly podcast on the craft of screenwriting and the U.S. film industry.

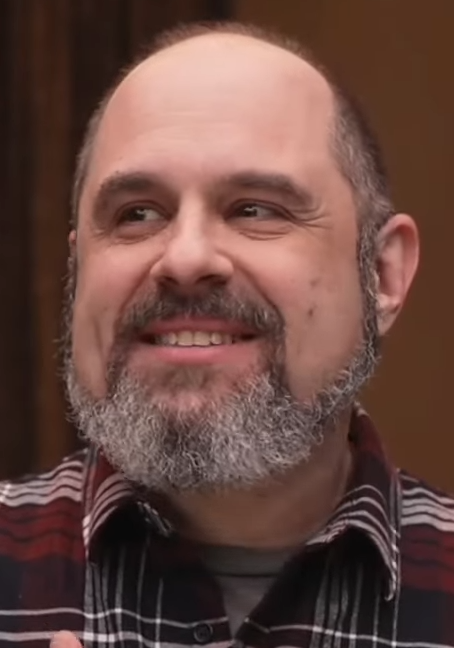
Mazin in January 2023

In 2017, HBO and Sky Television announced Chernobyl, a five-part drama miniseries created by Mazin about the infamous Chernobyl disaster. The series aired in 2019 and was filmed in Lithuania and Ukraine. Mazin said that the "lesson of Chernobyl isn't that modern nuclear power is dangerous [...] the lesson is that lying, arrogance, and suppression of criticism are dangerous". In an interview with Decider, he said, "If I came to HBO and said 'I want to do another season of Chernobyl, except it's gonna be about another tragedy,' whether it's Bhopal or Fukushima or something like that, I would imagine they at least would give me polite interest."

In 2019, it was announced that Disney had hired Mazin to co-write the screenplay of a sixth Pirates of the Caribbean movie with original Pirates screenwriter Ted Elliott. In July of that year, he withdrew his running for vice president of the Writers Guild of America West due to a "family issue." He was named as the scriptwriter for the Lionsgate film adaptation of the Borderlands video game series in February 2020, though his name was removed from the project by 2023.

He was announced as co-writer and co-executive producer for a television series adaptation of the video game The Last of Us for HBO and Sony Pictures TV in March 2020, alongside the game's co-director and writer Neil Druckmann. The Last of Us adaptation was greenlit by HBO in November 2020, and Season 1 was released in January 2023. In January 2021, Mazin signed an overall deal with HBO for an additional three years.

In July 2024, Mazin's screenplay to Leonie Swann's Three Bags Full was picked up by Amazon MGM. Mazin wrote the screenplay in 2016. The film's title was updated to The Sheep Detectives and it was released in theaters on May 15, 2026.

In June 2025, Mazin was announced to executive produce an e-sports drama, Damage, along with director and writer Celine Song. In August 2025, Mazin was tapped by HBO to executive produce Blackout Room, a high-concept mystery thriller drama. He will work alongside Jacqueline Lesko and Cecil O'Connor. In December 2025, Mazin, along with his production company, Word Games, was announced to be producing Natasha Lyonne's second feature film as a director, Bambo.

In February 2026, Mazin was tapped by HBO and Hasbro Entertainment to create, write, executive produce, and showrun a television series adaptation of the Baldur's Gate franchise, which will be a continuation to the videogames and will tell a story set immediately in the aftermath of the events of Baldur's Gate 3, as the characters are dealing with the ramifications of the events in the third game.

== Personal life ==
Mazin and his wife Melissa have two children, June and Jessica. He supported Democratic candidate Hillary Clinton in the 2016 presidential election. He has a tattoo of a switchblade belonging to The Last of Us's Ellie on his arm.

== Filmography ==
=== Film ===
Year	Title	Director	Writer	Producer
1997	RocketMan	No	Yes	No
1998	Senseless	No	Yes	No
2000	The Specials	Yes	No	Co-Producer
2003	Scary Movie 3	No	Yes	No
2006	Scary Movie 4	No	Yes	Yes
2008	Superhero Movie	Yes	Yes	Yes
2011	The Hangover Part II	No	Yes	No
2013	Identity Thief	No	Yes	No
2013	The Hangover Part III	No	Yes	No
2016	The Huntsman: Winter's War	No	Yes	No
2026	The Sheep Detectives	No	Yes	No

Executive producer

- School for Scoundrels (2006)

Additional literary material

- Dune: Part Two (2024)
- Wicked (2024)
- Wicked: For Good (2025)

Special thanks

- The Words (2012)
- Free Birds (2013)
- Don't Think Twice (2016)

Actor

Year	Title	Role	Notes
2006	Scary Movie 4	Saw Villain	Voice role
2008	Superhero Movie	Janitor	Cameo

=== Television ===
Year	Title	Director	Writer	Creator	Executive producer	Notes
2019	Chernobyl	No	Yes	Yes	Yes	Miniseries
2021	Mythic Quest	No	Yes	No	No	Episode "Backstory!"; Also credited as consulting producer
2023–present	The Last of Us	Yes	Yes	Yes	Yes	Directed episodes "When You're Lost in the Darkness" and "Future Days"

Actor

Year	Title	Role	Notes
2020–2021	Mythic Quest	Sol Green/Lou	6 episodes

== Accolades ==
Year	Award	Category	Title	Result
2019	Primetime Emmy Awards	Outstanding Limited Series	Chernobyl	Won
2019	Primetime Emmy Awards	Outstanding Writing for a Limited Series	Chernobyl	Won
2020	Broadcasting Press Guild Awards	Best Writer	Chernobyl	Won
2023	Primetime Emmy Awards	Outstanding Drama Series	The Last of Us	Nominated
2023	Primetime Emmy Awards	Outstanding Writing for a Drama Series	The Last of Us	Nominated
2023	Humanitas Prize	Drama Teleplay	The Last of Us: "Long, Long Time"	Won
2024	Writers Guild of America Awards	New Series	The Last of Us	Won
2024	Writers Guild of America Awards	Drama Series	The Last of Us	Nominated
2024	Peabody Awards	Peabody Award	The Last of Us	Won
2025	Primetime Emmy Awards	Outstanding Drama Series	The Last of Us	Nominated
2025	Humanitas Prize	Drama Teleplay	The Last of Us: "The Price"	Nominated
