= Dan Jinks =

American film and television producer

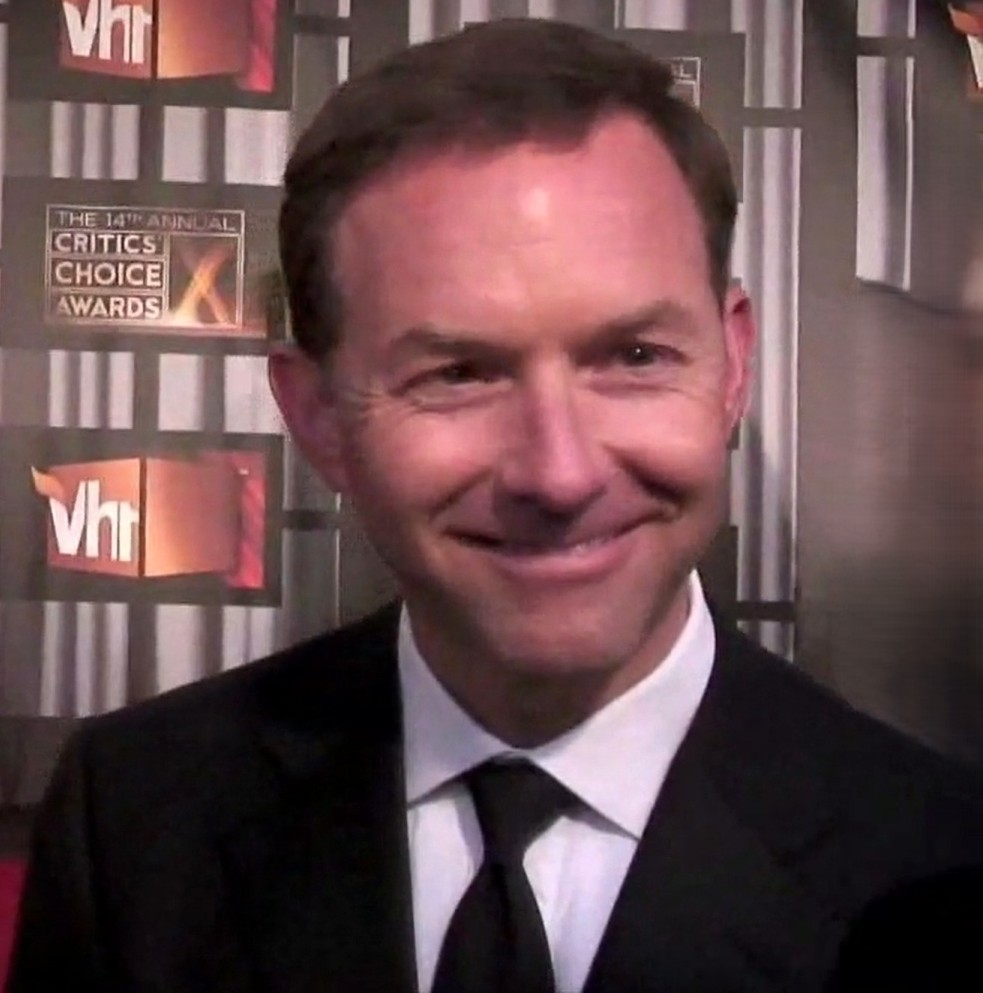
- Jinks in 2009
- Born: Miami, Florida, U.S.
- Occupations: Film and television producer
- Years active: 1997–present

Dan Jinks is an American film and television producer. In February 2010, Jinks launched his own film and television production company, the Dan Jinks Company. In July 2011, he signed an overall deal with CBS Television Studios.

== Life and career ==
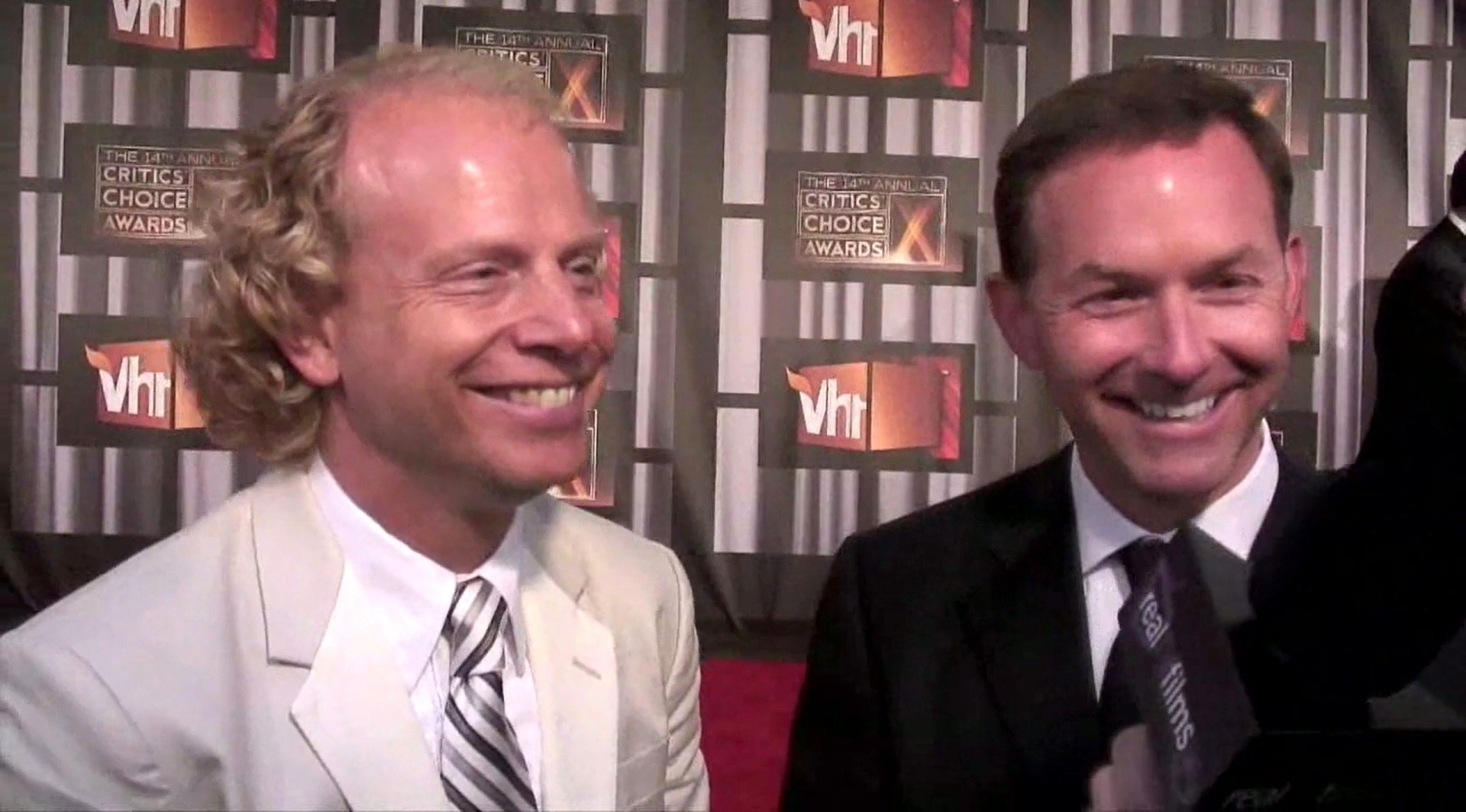
Left to right: Bruce Cohen and Dan Jinks in 2009

Previously, working with producing partner Bruce Cohen, Jinks produced Milk, directed by Gus Van Sant and starring Sean Penn as Harvey Milk. The film was nominated for 8 Academy Awards, including Best Picture, and won for Best Actor and Best Original Screenplay. Milk was named Best Picture of 2008 by the New York Film Critics Circle.

The pair won the Best Picture Academy Award in 2000 for producing American Beauty. The film, which won a total of five Oscars, was the first film produced through The Jinks/Cohen Company. Their second film was the sex comedy Down with Love starring Renée Zellweger and Ewan McGregor. Next up was Tim Burton's Big Fish, which was nominated as Best Picture for both the Golden Globes and the BAFTAs. Other films include The Forgotten, starring Julianne Moore, and John August's directing debut, The Nines, starring Ryan Reynolds, Melissa McCarthy and Hope Davis.

In television, Jinks and Cohen executive produced the acclaimed ABC series Pushing Daisies, which won eight Emmy Awards and was nominated for a Golden Globe as best television comedy. They also served as executive producers on the series Traveler (ABC) and Side Order of Life (Lifetime).

In the summer of 2008, Jinks and Cohen produced A Timeless Call, a tribute to war veterans that Steven Spielberg directed for the Democratic National Convention.

Jinks produced Nothing to Lose, starring Martin Lawrence and Tim Robbins for Touchstone Pictures, and executive produced The Bone Collector, with Denzel Washington and Angelina Jolie for Universal. A graduate of New York University's Tisch School of the Arts, Jinks began his career working in the theatre in New York. Along with Laurence Mark, for six years Dan has produced A Fine Romance, a benefit for the Motion Picture & Television Fund.

Jinks is openly gay.

== Filmography (as producer) ==
=== Film ===
- Nothing to Lose (1997)
- The Bone Collector (1999) (as executive producer)
- American Beauty (1999)
  - Won: Academy Award for Best Picture
- Down with Love (2003)
- Big Fish (2003)
- The Forgotten (2004)
- The Nines (2007)
- Milk (2008)
  - Nominated: Academy Award for Best Picture
- Pinocchio (TBA)
- Fiddler on the Roof (TBA)

=== Television ===
- Traveler (2007)
- Side Order of Life (2007)
- Pushing Daisies (2007–09)
- Emily Owens, M.D. (2012–13)
- Nancy Drew (2018)
- Sub/Liminal (TBA)
