= The Nines =

2007 film by John August

- Theatrical release poster
- Directed by: John August
- Written by: John August
- Produced by: Dan Jinks; Bruce Cohen; Dan Etheridge
- Starring: Ryan Reynolds; Hope Davis; Melissa McCarthy; Elle Fanning
- Cinematography: Nancy Schreiber
- Edited by: Douglas Crise
- Music by: Alex Wurman
- Distributed by: Destination Films; Newmarket Films
- Release dates: August 31, 2007 (United States; limited)
- Running time: 99 minutes
- Country: United States
- Language: English
- Box office: $130,880

The Nines is a 2007 American science fiction psychological thriller film written and directed by John August, and starring Ryan Reynolds, Hope Davis, Melissa McCarthy, and Elle Fanning.

Three seemingly disconnected stories, revolving around the lives of a troubled actor, a television show runner, and finally a successful videogame designer are later shown to be intertwined in mysterious and unsettling ways.

The film debuted at the 2007 Sundance Film Festival and made $63,165 in the U.S. box office through October 11, 2007.

== Plot ==
All three chapters of the film are centered around three men (played by Ryan Reynolds) trying to uncover the secret about strange happenings in their sometimes overlapping lives.

Part One: The Prisoner

Troubled actor Gary, who is wearing a green bracelet, is under house arrest in another person's house as he burned down his. The house's owner is a TV writer working elsewhere. There, Gary has contact with his P.R. "handler" Margaret, and the single mom next door, Sarah, who seems interested.

Obsessed with 'nine', including finding a note in his own handwriting saying "Look for the nines". Gary finds it over and over: while playing backgammon, reading newspaper advertisements...he sees them everywhere.

Asking Sarah about the number 9 concerns her. She cryptically tells him: "I can get you out of here". Seeing different versions of himself around the house unsettles him, so he crosses his house arrest barrier, which destroys reality in a blinding flash.

Part Two: Reality Television

Television writer Gavin is fighting to get his pilot produced, for Knowing, a series about a lost mother and daughter, starring his friend Melissa McCarthy. Discussing feedback, television executive and producer Susan, tells Gavin to look for the nines, which he writes on a postit, the one Gary found in Part One. He tells Melissa he believes he is haunted by himself.

In post-production, Susan pushes Gavin to ditch Melissa, his unconventional lead, in favor of a more attractive, well-known actress. This causes a rift between him and Melissa. He then discovers the proposed actress is not available, which Susan already knew.

Now without a lead, as Melissa has blocked him, Gavin confronts Susan about her sabotaging his show and about him being a subject on a reality television show. After a heated exchange, he snaps and slaps her.

Seemingly insulting his manhood for hitting a woman, Susan walks away, which leads to him telling the reality TV cameraman to go away. A pedestrian then asks him who he is talking to, and it is shown that the cameraman does not exist. He sees everyone else has a "7" floating above their heads while a "9" is floating above his own.

A flashback shows Gary's P.R. handler Margaret telling him he is God, a nine like the angels, while humans are sevens. He created the world and can destroy it with his mind. He exists in many different unreal forms. A distraught Gary does not believe this, so breaks his house arrest barrier.

Part Three: Knowing

Acclaimed video game designer Gabriel's car breaks down in the wilderness. So, he leaves his wife Mary and young daughter Noelle to get a better signal on his phone. Meeting Sierra, she leads him into the woods supposedly for a lift in her car to the gas station. Meanwhile, back at the car Noelle watches a video on a digital camera of Gavin talking to Melissa from Part Two and Margaret talking to Gary in Part One. Confused, she shows her mom, who is also confused.

Meanwhile, Sierra has drugged Gabriel with GHB. In all of the stories, Sarah, Sierra and Susan, has been trying to separate him from Mary/Melissa/Margaret so he realizes that none of these lives are real. She explains this is an intervention, and she and the other recurring characters have been trying to help him realize he is not human, but God, who has absorbed himself in various human incarnations for 4000 years. She likens it to video game addiction. He is needed back home, a place that cannot be imagined or described with human thoughts or words.

Gabriel returns to the car and they go home. Mary realises he has remembered his reality and needs to leave. Gabriel tells her that there were ninety different variations of the universe, and this is the last. He removes the green string and the universe morphs.

At film's end, Melissa McCarthy's character is married to Ben, to whom she had been married in Part Two, and Noelle is their daughter. Noelle tells her mother that "He's not coming back" and that "He put all the pieces together", and her mother finishes her sentence that this is "the best of all possible worlds."

== Cast ==
- Ryan Reynolds as:
  - Gary, a troubled actor
  - Gavin, a TV writer
  - Gabriel, a Computer-Game designer
- Melissa McCarthy as:
  - Margaret, Gary's PR handler
  - Herself, An actress in Gavin's TV show
  - Mary, Gabriel's wife.
- Hope Davis as:
  - Sarah, Gary's Neighbor
  - Susan, A TV executive for Gavin
  - Sierra, a mysterious woman who tries to help Gabriel
- Elle Fanning as Noelle
- David Denman as Parole Officer / Agitated Man
- Octavia Spencer as Streetwalker

== Production ==
According to August, the film was inspired by his experiences on his TV series D.C.. He developed the script further over the years, partially making it a quasi-sequel to his short film God (also featuring Melissa McCarthy). The movie was shot over 22 days in Los Angeles and two days in New York, with some scenes in John August's house. The movie was shot in a combination of video and film with everything being posted in high-definition.

== Soundtrack ==
- "You Keep Me Hangin' On" Performed by The Ferris Wheel
- "Trucha" Performed by Ghostman MC
- "Alive Transmission" Performed by The Shys
- "Hang On Little Tomato" Performed by Pink Martini
- "Is That All There Is" Performed by Hope Davis
- "Paper Plane" Performed by Persephone's Bees
- "Teenage Villain" Written by Keith Mansfield
- "Bang Bang to the Rock 'N' Roll" Performed by Gabin
- "Comet Samba" Performed by Cabaret Diosa
- "Monokini Ou Bikini" Performed by Georges Deligny
- "Romantico Bosanova" Written by Philippe Bestion
- "As Long as He Needs Me" Performed by Melissa McCarthy
- "Multiply" Performed by Jamie Lidell
- "Sugar Town" Performed by Juliet Turner
- "Myopia" Performed by The Skeem
- "Tears Coming Home" Performed by Sébastien Schuller
- "Chopin Nocturne 1, Opus 32" Performed by Danielle Luppi
- "The Other Side of Mt. Heart Attack" Performed by Liars
- "The Finish Line" Performed by Snow Patrol

== Reception ==
On Rotten Tomatoes the film has an approval rating of 65% based on 60 reviews, with an average critical rating of 5.93/10. On Metacritic, the film has a weighted average score of 52 out of 100, indicating "mixed or average reviews", based on 12 reviews: 6 positive, 3 mixed, and 3 negative.

Dennis Harvey of Variety wrote: "The Nines arcs from witty Hollywood insiderdom to a climactic metaphysical leap that may leave many viewers nonplussed. Nonetheless, there's more than enough intelligence, intrigue and performance dazzle to make this an adventuresome gizmo for grownups."

=== Accolades ===
34th Saturn Awards nomination for Best DVD release.
