= Scriptnotes =

Podcast about screenwriting

- Genre: TV & Film
- Language: English

Cast and voices
- Hosted by: John August; Craig Mazin

Production
- Length: 35–120 minutes

Publication
- No. of episodes: 682 (as of April 6, 2025)
- Original release: August 30, 2011

Related
- Website: Scriptnotes

Scriptnotes is a weekly podcast that began airing on August 30, 2011. It is billed as "a podcast about screenwriting, and things that are interesting to screenwriters." The podcast is hosted by screenwriters John August and Craig Mazin, with new episodes released every Tuesday.

The podcast has featured appearances from many notable people in the world of film and TV, including Christopher Nolan, Greta Gerwig, Rian Johnson, David Benioff and D.B. Weiss (the showrunners of Game of Thrones), Aline Brosh McKenna, Dana Fox, Rachel Bloom, Jennifer Lee, Riki Lindhome, Natasha Leggero, Alec Berg, Kelly Marcel, Rawson Marshall Thurber, Richard Kelly, Chris Nee, Malcolm Spellman, David Wain, and Jason Bateman.

Scriptnotes episodes are available for free up to 20 weeks after their initial airing. Back episode archives and bonus episodes are available to premium subscribers at scriptnotes.net. Transcripts of all back episodes are available for free, and are usually posted within one week of the episode's initial airing.

== History ==
August, who had been writing his popular eponymous screenwriting blog since 2003, developed an interest in podcasting and its potential to extend the work he had been doing to help the screenwriting community. He approached Mazin via email in June 2011 with the idea of producing a screenwriting podcast together. Despite being largely unfamiliar with the medium, Mazin agreed out of a desire to talk about screenwriting without writing about it, as he had been doing for a number of years on his blog, The Artful Writer. The inaugural episode of the podcast was released 30 August 2011.

== Recurring segments ==
=== Three-page challenge ===
Aspiring screenwriters are encouraged to send in three pages of their screenplay – almost always the first three – to be critiqued. The scripts vary widely in tone, style and genre. Links to the screenplays are provided in the show notes so listeners can read them and then listen to the critique. Typically three are tackled in one show. The three-page challenge is a particularly useful segment for screenwriters as it provides sharp insights into unproduced screenplays; lessons easily applied to a writer's own project. The segment was first announced with a call for submissions in episode 45 and the first critiques debuted the next week in episode 46.

=== One Cool Thing ===
One Cool Thing is a weekly segment that occurs at the end of each episode. John, Craig and their guests will each give a plug to something or someone they deem cool. The cool things vary greatly. The segment dates back to May 2012, when August officially started it at the end of episode 35. Since then he has been a faithful participant. Mazin's participation was suspect for a time, most notably during a six-week stretch that began in August 2012, but since then he has overcome his umbrage-tinted glasses and regularly found something in the world worth praising every week.

=== How Would This Be a Movie? ===
In this newer segment of the show, John and Craig pull a few current stories from the news and discuss if and how those stories could be adapted into feature films. The discussion often includes brainstorming possible genres and approaches a perspective writer could take with the story, discussing how to collapse or expand the details of the story to fit a feature film, and determining which of the week's stories, if any, have any serious potential as a future film. The segment debuted in episode 201, when the stories included scandals in FIFA, the Large Hadron Collider, and sexual assault on college campuses.

=== Deep dives ===
A number of episodes have been dedicated to deep dive analyses of individual films. The first such episode, in January 2013, featured Raiders of the Lost Ark. Subsequent episodes have looked at The Little Mermaid, Frozen, Groundhog Day, Ghost, Unforgiven and The Addams Family.

== Recurring themes/characters ==
The podcast has a number of recurring themes, particularly in how the hosts interact with one another.

=== August's intro is professional while Mazin's intro is affected ===
At the beginning of every podcast, August uses a 'straight' introduction, while Mazin uses a silly or mechanical voice.

=== Mazin acts lazy and August does all the work ===
Craig tells anecdotes about himself that emphasize how he is lazy, unprepared, and frequently late. In contrast, John appears productive, organized, and punctual.

=== John August as robot ===
In line with their personas of Mazin being the lazy one and August being the organized one, plus knowledgeable about technology, Craig mocks John by calling him a robot. This includes accusations that John has no emotions and no heart.

=== Segue Man ===
Craig is the more emotionally expressive of the two podcasts hosts. When he delivers impassioned speeches, John will typically agree with him on content and then transition into the next item on the agenda. Because of John's focus on pacing and transitions during the show, Craig has christened John "Segue Man."

=== Sexy Craig ===
Craig's deep-throated alter ego appears multiple times in the Scriptnotes catalogue; brought on by John's accidental double entendres. "Sexy Craig" is a master of the love-making arts and at making John notably uncomfortable.

=== Stuart ===
For five years up to episode 259, Stuart Friedel was August's assistant, and the producer and original editor of the podcast. With the exception of episode 259, Friedel's voice was never heard on the podcast. The hosts would frequently talk about Stuart, and the work that he did for the show, including reading and selecting scripts for the Three Page Challenge.

== Notable episodes ==
=== Revelations about the Game of Thrones pilot ===
David Benioff and D.B. Weiss, the showrunners of HBO's fantasy drama Game of Thrones, appeared on a live version of the podcast in February 2016. They spoke about the poor reception to the show's original pilot episode, and how it was largely reshot following a screening of the episode to Mazin and other screenwriters.

=== The One with the Guys from Final Draft ===
On episode 129, August and Mazin welcomed Final Draft CEO and co-founder Marc Madnick and then-product manager Joe Jarvis. Their visit was in response to negative comments made about the software on previous episodes of Scriptnotes, and came out of Madnick's desire to discuss what he perceived as misconceptions about both the software and the company.

Instead, Madnick offered a revealing look into—as described by the Accidental Tech Podcast—the company's shortcomings, management's apparent feeling that they should make "[their] problems your problems," and the "severe technical debt" Final Draft has ignored for far too long, resulting in out of date, difficult to update, and unnecessarily expensive software.

In response to the episode's controversy, filmmaker and software developer Kent Tessman pointed out that a possible reason many of Madnick's excuses were met with pushback is that, simply, "there might be technical people listening".

=== The She-Hulk controversy ===
As part of Scriptnotes's 2014 Summer Superhero Spectacular live show, August and Mazin played a game with guests Andrea Berloff, Christopher Markus & Stephen McFeely and David S. Goyer. Each was randomly assigned a superhero and asked how they would adapt the character for TV or film.

Talking about She-Hulk, Goyer said:

I have a theory about She-Hulk. Which was created by a man, right? And at the time in particular I think 95% of comic book readers were men and certainly almost all of the comic book writers were men. So the Hulk was this classic male power fantasy. It’s like, most of the people reading comic books were these people like me who were just these little kids getting the shit kicked out of them every day... And so then they created She-Huk, right? Who was still smart... I think She-Hulk is the chick that you could fuck if you were Hulk, you know what I’m saying? ... She-Hulk was the extension of the male power fantasy. So it’s like if I’m going to be this geek who becomes the Hulk then let’s create a giant green porn star that only the Hulk could fuck.

The day after the episode's release, Alan Kistler of The Mary Sue wrote about these comments as well as Goyer's take on Martian Manhunter. His summation:

So to recap. She-Hulk is just a sex power fantasy rather than a character with agency who from the beginning went down a different path than her cousin, The Hulk. Martian Manhunter being the last survivor of a race which died out on Mars over a thousand years ago is goofy, but putting him Area 51 and using the same plot as many alien visitor movies is not. And God forbid superheroes embrace some goofiness and absurdity. [sic]

This prompted Michael Cavana from The Washington Post's Comic Riffs to reach out to She-Hulk co-creator Stan Lee for a response.

When Lee, as writer, co-created She-Hulk with artist John Buscema (the character debuted in February of 1980, in Savage She-Hulk #1), he was absolutely focused on his gamma-green superheroine having brains. Lee tells The Post’s Comic Riffs this evening, in response to Goyer’s words: “I know I was looking for a new female superhero, and the idea of an intelligent Hulk-type grabbed me.”

=== Mazin and Ted Cruz ===
During his freshman year at Princeton University, Mazin was roommates with future junior U.S. Senator and 2016 presidential candidate Ted Cruz. Mazin has been open about his dislike for Cruz, and on episode 113 said:

And, you know, I want to be clear, because Ted Cruz is a nightmare of a human being. I have plenty of problems with his politics, but truthfully his personality is so awful that ninety-nine percent of why I hate him is just his personality. If he agreed with me on every issue, I would hate him only one percent less.

Mazin's comment was picked up by The Daily Show, The Huffington Post, Texas Monthly, The Telegraph, The Sun Times, and more.

== Live shows ==
Live events for the podcast have been sponsored by The Academy of Motion Picture Arts and Sciences, the Austin Film Festival, and the Writers Guild Foundation. Scriptnotes has also produced a crossover episode with The Nerdist Writers Panel podcast. They also host a yearly live show to benefit the non-profit organization Hollywood Heart.

== Reception ==
Scriptnotes has received positive reviews. As of January 3, 2018, it has an average rating of 5 out of 5 stars on podbay.fm, with 1045 users weighing in.

It was ranked as one of the 11 best movie podcasts by MTV. Esquire selected the podcast as one of its 13 favorite podcasts of 2016, writing "Whether you're an aspiring screenwriter or a plain old movie fan, Scriptnotes offers a unique insider's perspective into the business". It was listed among the week's best radio by The Guardian in September 2017. Vulture called the show 'highly influential' for screenwriters. In a 2016 interview with The Wall Street Journal, actor and director Elizabeth Banks revealed that Scriptnotes was her favorite podcast.

The podcast has been discussed by Vanity Fair and The Washington Post, among others.

== Access to back episodes ==
The most recent 20 episodes of Scriptnotes are available for free on all podcast services, including iTunes, as well as via johnaugust.com. Back episodes and bonus segments are available through scriptnotes.net for $4.99 per month.
