= The Forgotten (2004 film) =

2004 film directed by Joseph Ruben

- Theatrical release poster
- Directed by: Joseph Ruben
- Screenplay by: Gerald Di Pego
- Produced by: Bruce Cohen; Dan Jinks; Joe Roth
- Starring: Julianne Moore; Dominic West; Gary Sinise; Alfre Woodard; Linus Roache; Anthony Edwards
- Cinematography: Anastas N. Michos
- Edited by: Richard Francis-Bruce
- Music by: James Horner
- Production companies: Columbia Pictures; Revolution Studios
- Distributed by: Sony Pictures Releasing
- Release date: September 24, 2004 (United States)
- Running time: 91 minutes (original); 94 minutes (unrated cut)
- Country: United States
- Language: English
- Budget: $42 million
- Box office: $117.5 million

The Forgotten is a 2004 American science fiction psychological thriller film directed by Joseph Ruben and written by Gerald Di Pego. It stars Julianne Moore, Dominic West, Gary Sinise, Alfre Woodard, Linus Roache, and Anthony Edwards. The film follows a woman who lost her nine-year-old son in a plane crash 14 months earlier, only to have her husband and psychiatrist explain she is suffering from unreliable fantasies after a miscarriage. She sets out in search for solid evidence of her son's existence.

It was produced by Bruce Cohen, Dan Jinks, and Joe Roth, with Todd Garner and Steve Nicolaides serving as executive producers. The film was theatrically released in the United States on September 24, 2004, by Columbia Pictures through Sony Pictures Releasing. The Forgotten received generally negative reviews from critics, but was a box-office success, grossing $117.5 million at the worldwide box office.

== Plot ==
Telly Paretta grieves the loss of her son Sam, who died 14 months prior in a plane crash. She holds regular vigils in his undisturbed bedroom, visits his grave, and meets with a therapist to deal with her grief, though her husband, Jim, wants to move on.

Returning from work one afternoon, Telly finds that her photo album of Sam no longer contains his photos. Furious, she confronts Jim for trying to forget, but her husband shocks her with a counter accusation: That she is, in actuality, delusional and that they have never had a son.

Hurt, Telly begins reaching out to acquaintances to confirm Sam's existence; however, her friend Eliot doesn't appear to believe in Sam's existence despite her closeness to him. Looking for concrete evidence, Dr. Munce, her therapist, meets with her and Jim. She is told that she was pregnant, but that she miscarried and "Sam" is her delusional fantasy about how her life would have been different if he had lived. He recommends that she be sent to a hospital, but she runs away.

Fleeing and still adamant that Sam is real, she locates her neighbor Ash, whose daughter Lauren was Sam's friend and died in the same crash. She finds Lauren's drawings underneath wallpaper in Ash's apartment, and tries to convince him they were made by his daughter. However, he claims he never had a daughter and calls the police. Shaken by Telly's certainty, Ash looks again at the drawings and remembers his daughter.

Chasing after Telly, he rescues her from the police and they go into hiding, pursued by NSA agents. On the run, they speculate about who would have the power, resources, and motive to want to make them forget about their children. Telly visits Jim, but he doesn't remember her.

Telly and Ash capture and threaten a pursuing agent, who reluctantly reveals that he and other agents are merely helping "them" in order to protect humankind. Without warning, the roof of the house blows off and the agent, along with the roof, is sucked into the sky—presumably taken by "them"—and Telly and Ash flee.

When Telly and Ash hide out at a house, detective Anne Pope and Munce arrive. Pope finds a man, who has been following Telly and Ash, and shoots him, only for his wounds to close up. Ash runs away with Munce after telling Telly to meet him at his apartment. When she tries to run, Pope stops her, telling her that she believes her, before being sucked into the sky. Telly leaves and finds Ash, only for them to be attacked by the mysterious man, and Ash is sucked into the sky.

Telly talks to Munce and he reveals that the disappearances are the work of "them", and that the government monitors their trials, all too aware that they have no power to stop "them" from doing whatever they want.

Munce takes Telly to an airport and the dilapidated hangar of Quest Airlines, where he introduces her to an agent of "them". He tells the agent that it is over and to stop the experiment, because it will only cause more harm. But the agent replies that it is not over. He reveals to Telly that she has been a part of an experiment to test whether the bonds between mother and child can be diminished. In her case, her memories could not be fully erased.

Telly refuses to deny her son's existence. The agent mentions that if he fails to erase her memory then he will look like a failure. The agent then subdues her and convinces her to think of the first memory she had of Sam. Telly thinks of the day he was born in the hospital, which allows the agent to successfully erase Sam's memory from existence.

As the agent is walking away thinking he has succeeded, Telly's motherly bond kicks in deeper to the time she was pregnant with Sam, triggering her memory that she indeed had life in her at one time. All of her memories of Sam return. Before the agent can comprehend what's happening, part of the hangar roof is suddenly blown off, and he is yanked into the sky himself for his failure to erase her memory. This ends the experiment.

Telly finds herself living a normal life, with memories of everything that has happened. She reunites with Sam at a park. Also at the park is Ash, watching over his daughter. Like Sam, he has no memory of what has happened. Telly reintroduces herself, and the two sit and watch the kids play in the playground.

== Cast ==
- Julianne Moore as Telly Paretta
- Dominic West as Ash
- Christopher Kovaleski as Sam Paretta
  - Matthew Pleszewicz as Sam at age 5
- Jessica Hecht as Eliot
- Gary Sinise as Dr. Jack Munce
- Alfre Woodard as Anne Pope
- Anthony Edwards as Jim Paretta
- Kathryn Faughnan as Lauren
- Linus Roache as A Friendly Man
- Lee Tergesen as Al Petalis
- Felix Solis as Brasher
- Robert Wisdom as Carl Dayton
- Tim Kang as Agent Alec Wong
- Susan Misner as Agent Lisa Franks
- J. Tucker Smith as Sheriff Howell
- Ann Dowd as Eileen The Accountant

== Production ==
Revolution Studios purchased the script in 2001 and lobbied for Nicole Kidman to play the lead role. Julianne Moore was cast in 2003, and the rest of the cast was announced shortly before filming began.

=== Filming ===
Principal photography mostly took place in New York City, beginning on October 25, 2003.

== Release ==
The film was released theatrically on September 24, 2004.

=== Basic cable ===
When the film was aired on basic cable the accident was changed, with all mentions of "plane" and "airport" dubbed to "bus" and "terminal".

== Reception ==
=== Box office ===
The film opened September 24, 2004 in the United States and Canada and grossed $21 million in 3,104 theaters its opening weekend, ranking #1 at the box office.

The film cost $42 million to produce and it eventually grossed $67.1 million in the U.S. and Canada and $50.4 million in other territories, for a worldwide gross of $117.5 million.

=== Critical reception ===
Critics gave the film generally mixed-to-negative reviews. On the review aggregator Rotten Tomatoes, 31% of critics gave the film positive reviews, based on 172 reviews with an average rating of 5/10. The website's critical consensus states that "The premise grows too ridiculous to take seriously". On Metacritic, the film had an average score of 43 out of 100, based on 34 reviews, indicating "mixed or average reviews". Audiences polled by CinemaScore gave the film an average grade of "B−" on an A+ to F scale.

Ann Hornaday of The Washington Post called the film "an uneasy mix between Eternal Sunshine of the Spotless Mind and The X-Files, and one not nearly as smart as either." William Arnold of the Seattle Post-Intelligencer gave it an A−, saying, "It struck me as the most exciting and original Hollywood thriller, occult or otherwise, since The Sixth Sense." Roger Ebert gave the film 2 stars out of 4 stating, "The Forgotten is not a good movie, but at least it supplies a credible victim."

== See also ==
- List of American films of 2004
- Flightplan
