= Arlo Finch in the Valley of Fire =

2018 novel by John August

- Author: John August
- Language: English
- Series: Arlo Finch #1
- Genre: Middle-grade fiction
- Publisher: Roaring Brook Press, Macmillan Publishing
- Publication date: February 6, 2018
- Publication place: United States of America
- Media type: Print (Hardback)
- Pages: 336
- ISBN: 978-1-62672-814-1
- Followed by: Arlo Finch in the Lake of the Moon

Arlo Finch in the Valley of Fire is a middle-grade fiction fantasy novel, written by American screenwriter John August. It was published on February 6, 2018 by Roaring Brook Press, an imprint of the Macmillan Children’s Publishing Group. It is the first book in a planned Arlo Finch trilogy, and is based on August's own experience as a Boy Scout.

In addition to English, the book has been published in 11 other languages, beginning in September 2018.

== Reception ==
Amazon's editors named Arlo Finch in the Valley of Fire as one of the "Best children's books of 2018 so far."

Booklist wrote: “Accomplished screenwriter August artfully thrusts readers into a whole new world, right alongside Arlo... This is just the first volume in a new series, so readers won’t have to wait long to plunge back into the mysterious Long Woods.”

Kirkus Reviews had a more mixed reaction: "Atmospheric at best, formulaic at worst".

== Sequels ==
August signed a deal with Roaring Brook Press to write an Arlo Finch trilogy. Arlo Finch in the Lake of the Moon was released February 5, 2019. After, Arlo Finch in the Kingdom of Shadows was released February 4, 2020.

== Launch podcast ==
In January 2018, August debuted Launch, a six-episode podcast series produced by Wondery, that chronicles his experience writing, selling and releasing Arlo Finch, his debut novel. On its first day of release, Launch reached the top 10 on the iTunes podcast chart.
