= We Are Guardians =

- Film poster
- Directed by: Chelsea Greene; Rob Grobman; Edivan Guajajara
- Produced by: Maura Anderson; Zak Kilberg; Fisher Stevens
- Edited by: Atanas Georgiev; Carla Roda
- Distributed by: Area 23a
- Release date: May 3, 2023 (Hot Docs)
- Running time: 85 minutes
- Countries: United States; Brazil
- Languages: Portuguese; Tupi; English
- Box office: $48,417

We Are Guardians is a 2023 documentary film about efforts to save the Amazon rainforest in South America from deforestation. The film is directed by Chelsea Greene, Rob Grobman, and Edivan Guajajara. Bruce Cohen and Leonardo DiCaprio are two of the executive producers. The film premiered at the 2023 Hot Docs Canadian International Documentary Festival.

== Reception ==
On the review aggregator website Rotten Tomatoes, 100% of 12 critics' reviews are positive, with an average rating of 7.9/10. Metacritic, which uses a weighted average, assigned the film a score of 69 out of 100, based on five critics, indicating "generally favorable" reviews.

Christy Lemire of RogerEbert.com gave the film three out of four stars and wrote, "Logging is a huge industry in Brazil, particularly under the recent regime of former President Bolsonaro, who wanted to suppress the rights of Indigenous people and exploit the region for potassium. When you look at it from that perspective, it seems as if there's no end in sight, and the issue seems too massive for anyone—or any film—to get their arms around." Kent Hill of Film Threat gave the film a score of 8 out of 10, writing, "We Are Guardians is a poignantly timed reminder that the time to act is now. The filmmakers have taken an engulfing forefront approach to deliver to us, the audience, the immensity of the disaster occurring as we sit, breathing clean air, and not giving a single thought to the fact that, in the future, a lung full of fresh air might not be as readily available."
