= The Sheep Detectives =

2026 film by Kyle Balda

- Theatrical release poster
- Directed by: Kyle Balda
- Written by: Craig Mazin
- Based on: Three Bags Full by Leonie Swann
- Produced by: Lindsay Doran; Tim Bevan; Eric Fellner
- Starring: Hugh Jackman; Nicholas Braun; Nicholas Galitzine; Molly Gordon; Julia Louis-Dreyfus; Bryan Cranston; Chris O'Dowd; Regina Hall; Patrick Stewart; Bella Ramsey; Brett Goldstein; Hong Chau; Emma Thompson
- Cinematography: George Steel
- Edited by: Martin Walsh; Paul Machliss; Al LeVine
- Music by: Christophe Beck
- Production companies: Amazon MGM Studios; Working Title Films; Three Strange Angels; Lord Miller Productions
- Distributed by: Amazon MGM Studios (United States and Canada) (Note: Released through the Metro-Goldwyn-Mayer banner.); Sony Pictures Releasing International (International) (Note: excludes France (Amazon Prime Video))
- Release date: May 8, 2026 (United States)
- Running time: 109 minutes
- Countries: United Kingdom; United States
- Language: English
- Budget: $75 million
- Box office: $133 million

The Sheep Detectives is a 2026 mystery comedy-drama film directed by Kyle Balda and written by Craig Mazin, based on the 2004 novel Three Bags Full by Leonie Swann. The film features an ensemble cast including Hugh Jackman, Nicholas Braun, Nicholas Galitzine, Molly Gordon, Hong Chau, and Emma Thompson, with the voices of Julia Louis-Dreyfus, Bryan Cranston, Chris O'Dowd, Regina Hall, Patrick Stewart, Bella Ramsey, and Brett Goldstein (in a dual role). The film follows a flock of sheep who try to solve the murder of their shepherd as they figure out which person their shepherd knew was responsible for it. This was Stewart's last film to be released during his lifetime, as he died five months after its release.

Three Bags Full: A Sheep Detective Movie was first written by Mazin in 2016, and after a long period of dormancy, active development began in 2024 with casting announcements made from March through June. Balda was confirmed to direct in June. Framestore provided the animation for the animals in the film, while its score was composed by Christophe Beck.

The film was released in the United States by Amazon MGM Studios and internationally by Sony Pictures Releasing International on 8 May 2026. The film received positive reviews from critics and grossed $133 million on a $75 million budget.

== Plot ==
On his farm near the English village of Denbrook, shepherd George Hardy spends his time looking after his flock of sheep and reading murder mystery novels to them. The sheep live in blissful ignorance, believing that death only exists in fiction and that they turn into clouds at the end of their lives. When faced with an uncomfortable situation, they can will themselves to forget. They discriminate against an orphan lamb born in winter rather than the typical spring.

One morning, George is discovered dead outside his trailer. Reporter Elliot Matthews believes he was murdered and encourages Officer Tim Derry to investigate. Tim concludes that George was poisoned. The sheep decide to solve the mystery on their own, led by crime aficionado ewe Lily, the ram Mopple who always keeps his memories, and stoic loner Sebastian whom George rescued from a carnival.

During the reading of George's will—attended by Elliot, Tim, George's solicitor Lydia Harbottle, Reverend Hillcoate, butcher Ham Gilyard, innkeeper Beth Pennock, and neighbouring shepherd Caleb Merrow—they learn that George had a twin son and daughter who were sent away for adoption after their mother died in childbirth. The daughter, Rebecca Hampstead, also in attendance, reconnected with George and had just arrived from the United States to visit him for the first time. Lydia ousts Elliot before calling George's son, Peter Van Vuuren, who lives in South Africa, so he can attend remotely. They learn George was secretly a millionaire after selling the patent for an orf medicine he invented. The new will awards his fortune to Rebecca, replacing an old will which donated it to an animal rights charity.

Cloud, a member of the flock, reveals she found one of Rebecca's bangles the night of the murder, contradicting Rebecca's claim of never having met her father. The sheep lead Tim to the meadow where he finds the bangle. He then discovers the type of berry used to poison George squashed in the soles of Rebecca's boots, and she is placed under arrest.

Lily and Mopple, soon to be taken in by Caleb, visit his meadow to meet their future flock mates, but discover that Caleb owns a slaughterhouse and has been collaborating with Ham to slaughter sheep for meat. They are attacked and chased by Caleb's vicious German Shepherds, but Sebastian returns and fights the dogs in order to protect Lily and Mopple. Despite suffering grievous wounds during the fight, Sebastian manages to drive the dogs off before dying from his injuries. Lily realises that death is real, and that she had willed herself to forget every time a sheep close to her died.

Lily tries to lead the other sheep to safety, but they become terrified and will themselves to forget, leaving her despondent. Mopple encourages her to embrace her memories of their deceased loved ones. Lily still tries to forget George but speaks to his ghost and realises that Rebecca is innocent and has been framed by the real killer. She and Mopple recruit the winter lamb to sneak into the jail and paint a message with his hooves.

Tim is in the process of handing Rebecca over to the county police officers when he suddenly suspects that she is innocent. The sheep help Tim conclude that "Elliot" is Peter. Peter dyed his hair and assumed a new identity before murdering George, whose hands were stained in the scuffle by the medicine and dye. Peter then forged a will to make it appear that Rebecca had a motive, so after her conviction he would inherit his father's fortune as his next-of-kin. Peter attempts to flee, but twin rams Ronnie and Reggie destroy his car. Peter is arrested by the county police while Rebecca is cleared of all charges.

Rebecca learns from Beth that her and Peter's mother was named Lily. Rebecca takes her father's surname, claims ownership of the meadow and sheep, and buys Caleb's French-speaking sheep to keep Caleb and Ham from slaughtering them. As Rebecca sits down to read to the flock, Lily adopts the Winter Lamb, naming him George. She looks towards the sunset and sees a cloud resembling Sebastian.

== Cast ==
=== Live action cast ===
- Hugh Jackman as George Hardy, a vegetarian shepherd who is mysteriously found dead
- Nicholas Braun as Tim Derry, a clumsy local police officer who is the only police officer in Denbrook
- Nicholas Galitzine as Elliot Matthews, an intrepid junior reporter that arrives in Denbrook
- Molly Gordon as Rebecca Hampstead, George's estranged daughter
- Hong Chau as Beth Pennock, the innkeeper who George used to date at one point
- Emma Thompson as Lydia Harbottle, George's lawyer/solicitor
- Tosin Cole as Caleb Merrow, George's neighbor, fellow shepherd, and slaughterhouse owner that George dislikes
- Kobna Holdbrook-Smith as Reverend Hillcoate, a priest who George considers a "bad shepherd"
- Conleth Hill as Ham Gilyard, a butcher and Caleb's collaborator who George also dislikes
- Mandeep Dhillon as Postwoman Jo, a mail carrier
- Sarah Flind as Tonia, a tow truck driver that helps with Elliot's crashed car
- Michael Wildman as Frank, a county police officer who is summoned by Tim

=== Sheep and lamb voices ===
- Julia Louis-Dreyfus as Lily, an intelligent Shetland ewe trying to solve the mystery of George's death
- Bryan Cranston as Sebastian, an imposing black Castlemilk Moorit ram and former underground prize fighter at a carnival that was rescued by George
- Chris O'Dowd as Mopple, a Merino ram who never forgets things
- Regina Hall as Cloud, a North Country Cheviot ewe who is proud of being the fluffiest sheep in George's meadow
- Patrick Stewart as Sir Ritchfield, an elderly Boreray Blackface ram. This is Stewart's final voice role before his death in October 2026.
- Bella Ramsey as Zora, a curious Herdwick lamb with brown wool
- Rhys Darby as Wool-Eyes, an accident-prone Lincoln Longwool ram who gets his name from the wool in front of his eyes
- Brett Goldstein as Ronnie and Reggie, twin Norfolk Horn rams named after the Kray twins who enjoy bashing things with their horns
- Laraine Newman as a "fainting sheep"
- Aroop Shergill as Daisy, a lamb
- Jasper Ambrose as Oliver, a lamb
- Ishi Agrawal as Pickles, a lamb
- Tommy Birchall as the Winter Lamb, an outcast orphaned lamb born in winter who is later named 'George' by Lily

== Production ==
=== Development ===
Craig Mazin learned about the novel Three Bags Full: A Sheep Detective Story by Leonie Swann when producer Lindsay Doran brought it to him in 2007, and he found himself "enchanted by how smart, moving and philosophical it was." It took Doran nearly a decade to secure the rights before Mazin wrote the first draft for the first studio it was set up with in 2016. The studio ultimately decided not to produce the film, but Courtenay Valenti was familiar with the script, and purchased the project at Amazon MGM Studios. When the project was back in active development, Kyle Balda was hired to direct the film.

=== Casting ===
In March 2024, it was revealed that Hugh Jackman and Emma Thompson were cast in the lead roles. In June, Nicholas Braun, Nicholas Galitzine, Molly Gordon, Hong Chau, Tosin Cole, Kobna Holdbrook-Smith, Conleth Hill and Mandeep Dhillon rounded out the cast. Bryan Cranston, Julia Louis-Dreyfus, Chris O'Dowd, Regina Hall, and Patrick Stewart were announced as having joined the cast in April 2025.

=== Filming ===
Principal photography took place from June to July 2024 in a number of locations across Buckinghamshire, Hertfordshire, Oxfordshire and Surrey, most notably in Ivinghoe, at White Pond Farm and in Shepperton Studios. Visual effects for the film were completed by Framestore, and Clear Angle Studios. Christophe Beck composed the film's score. The film's closing theme is the 1988 song "I'm Gonna Be (500 Miles)" by The Proclaimers, remixed by Kriz Kovacs.

== Release ==
The Sheep Detectives had its special advanced preview screenings on May 2, 2026, and was released in the United States on May 8 by Amazon MGM Studios.

It was originally scheduled to release on February 20, 2026, under the title Three Bags Full: A Sheep Detective Movie, but was pushed to November 13, 2026 to pull in more families. In October 2025, it was reported that the film had been retitled The Sheep Detectives, and was moved to its eventual May premiere to avoid competition with the then-scheduled February 27 release of the later-delayed animated film adaptation of The Cat in the Hat.

=== Home media ===
The Sheep Detectives was released on Amazon Prime Video on June 24, 2026. FlixPatrol reported that the film climbed to No. 1 on Prime streaming worldwide. The film was released on DVD and Blu-ray on August 25, 2026.

== Reception ==
=== Box office ===
As of 9 September 2026, The Sheep Detectives has grossed $66.1 million in the United States and Canada, and $66.9 million in other territories, for a worldwide total of $132.9 million.

In the United States and Canada, The Sheep Detectives was released alongside Mortal Kombat II and Billie Eilish – Hit Me Hard and Soft: The Tour (Live in 3D), and was projected to gross $12–15 million from 3,457 theaters during the Mother's Day weekend. It made $4 million on its first day, including $1.03 million from Thursday night previews. It went on to debut to $15.1 million, finishing in fourth. In its second weekend the film made $9.6 million, finishing in fifth. In its third weekend it made $9.2 million, including $12.3 million over the four-day Memorial Day frame.

=== Critical response ===
On the review aggregator website Rotten Tomatoes, 95% of 216 critics' reviews are positive, with an average rating of 7.5/10. The website's consensus reads: "Drolly funny and sweet as a lamb, The Sheep Detectives is a delightful family entertainment that bundles disarmingly profound themes in a cozy package." Metacritic, which uses a weighted average, assigned the film a score of 72 out of 100, based on 37 critics, indicating "generally favorable" reviews. Audiences surveyed by CinemaScore gave the film an average grade of "A–" on an A+ to F scale, and audiences polled by PostTrak gave it a 75% "definite recommend".

Aparita Bhandari of The Globe and Mail said the cast is "truly an enviable cast of performers, and they deliver." Harry Stainer of Empire said the film had an "abundance of pathos", which was "helped in large part by the voice cast that bring this adorable animated flock to life – especially Julia Louis-Dreyfus' Lily, Chris O'Dowd's soulful Mopple, and Bella Ramsey's high-energy, question-asking lamb." Shirley Li of The Atlantic says the sheep "outshine the human characters at every turn." Guy Lodge of the Variety said "the film delights" when "the sheep get to run the show" and Mazin's "script is shakiest when the action pivots to the village."

Jo Berry of Digital Spy said, "Hong Chau and Emma Thompson are woefully underused, and Thompson's deliciously delivered put-downs only serve to highlight the fact that the movie is only mildly amusing, rather than uproariously funny, when she isn't around." Pete Hammond of Deadline Hollywood wrote "the starry voice cast delivers on all fronts, especially with lines provided by Mazin's witty and wise script." Frank Scheck of The Hollywood Reporter said Jackman "proves so charismatic that it's easy to understand why George's flock would devote themselves to finding his murderer."

Nate Adams of TheOnlyCritic felt the film "has no right to be this affecting, this thoughtful, or this complete, and I am deeply grateful that it exists." Moira Macdonald of The Seattle Times called it an "enchanting film with moving messages." Alissa Wilkinson of The New York Times felt all elements of the film, "humor, mystery, goofiness and even sentimentality, all balanced beautifully". It's a movie that treats each member of its audience with respect, no matter their age." Sam Adams of Slate says "the sheep are more engrossing than the crime they're solving, because what they're really trying to understand isn't who killed George but what it means that he's dead."

Katie Walsh of The Detroit News wrote the film is "the best endorsement for exposing animals to works of mystery fiction, and an important correction to the stereotype that sheep aren't the smartest creatures in the animal kingdom." Drew Munhausen of Nerdtropolis said the film was "full of wit, colorful visuals, and an absolutely delightful array of memorable sheep characters."

Michael Conway of JoBlo commented that "the script commits to the ridiculousness without treating the audience like idiots, and Mazin threads that needle beautifully." Nikki Baughan of Screen International said Balda "knows how to effectively stage comedic set-pieces, and – crucially – keep things moving along briskly and the energy high." Tim Grierson of The A.V. Club said Balda "leads us down one path for some time" but "the final reveal hints at the cleverness and care woven into the film from the start." Jim Vejvoda of IGN said the film is "a very sweet, and often quite moving, family comedy about grief and death...with the broad humor of some of the human characters being the film's weakest aspect." Kristy Puchko of Mashable called it "a big swing for its bonkers ambition."

Clarisse Loughrey of The Independent said "the melodrama helps land the comedy" and "there's some real charm to be found here." "There's such deep messages I was not expecting from a movie about sheep," according to Rachel Choy of Refinery29. Odie Henderson of The Boston Globe calls the film "a lovely little gem that deserves all the praise." Matt Neglia of Next Best Picture says the "entire film has a wonderfully bouncy rhythm, light on its feet in its pacing, music, and cinematography, yet never overly frivolous." He also named it the 15th best movie of 2026. Linda Marric of HeyUGuys says it's "a warm, whimsical film with more depth than you might expect."

Robbie Collin of The Daily Telegraph said the film "owes an obvious debt" to the Babe films for it is "a profoundly odd viewing experience – entirely pleasant, lightly funny and easily absorbed." William Bibbiani of TheWrap says it is a "remarkable family flick" that "will leave a lasting impression." Peter Bradshaw of The Guardian says "the murder...doesn't get swamped with sadness and shock." G. Allen Johnson of San Francisco Chronicle says the movie "plays like an episode of "Murder, She Wrote" – if Jessica Fletcher were a sheep instead of Angela Lansbury."
