= Traveler (American TV series) =

American TV program

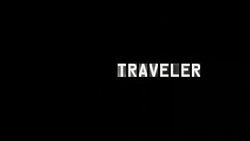
- Traveler intertitle
- Genre: Drama; Thriller
- Created by: David DiGilio
- Written by: David DiGilio
- Starring: Aaron Stanford; Matt Bomer; Logan Marshall-Green
- Composer: Trevor Morris
- Country of origin: United States
- Original language: English
- No. of seasons: 1
- No. of episodes: 8

Production
- Executive producers: Bruce Cohen; Dan Jinks; Charles Grant Craig
- Producer: Joseph Patrick Finn
- Cinematography: Roger Vernon
- Editors: Paul Karasick; Kevin D. Ross; Scott J. Wallace
- Running time: approx. 42 minutes per episode without advertisements
- Production companies: Warner Bros. Television; The Jinks/Cohen Company

Original release
- Network: ABC
- Release: May 10 – July 18, 2007

Traveler is an American thriller drama television series that ran from May 10, 2007, until July 18, 2007, on ABC in the United States. The series was produced by Warner Bros. Television.

Traveler was officially canceled after eight first-run episodes on July 18, 2007. David DiGilio, the creator, posted an "answers blog" on September 28, 2007, which officially ended the show.

== Synopsis ==
The series follows Jay Burchell (Matt Bomer) and Tyler Fog (Logan Marshall-Green), two graduate students who become suspects when the fictitious Drexler Museum in New York is bombed while they are pulling a juvenile prank. It appears that their friend and roommate, Will Traveler (Aaron Stanford), has framed them for the bombing. Afterwards, Traveler disappears and there is no evidence that he ever existed. Jay and Tyler flee from the authorities, who believe them to be domestic terrorists. While on the run and trying to clear their own names, they attempt to delve into Will Traveler's past in hopes of discovering Will's motives for turning on his friends.

Meanwhile, Traveler goes on a similar search for answers. It is revealed that he is in fact a secret agent working for a division of the Department of Homeland Security called the Fourth Branch, and slowly a complex conspiracy is unraveled.

Jay and Tyler reunite with Will by the seventh episode, and together the three attempt to bring those responsible to justice. They manage to kidnap Jack Freed, director of the Fourth Branch, but before they can use him to clear Jay and Tyler's names, the limousine with Jack Freed in it explodes and the series was cancelled with no further resolution.

== Cast and characters ==
The main cast of Traveler. From left to right: Logan Marshall-Green, Aaron Stanford and Matt Bomer.

Traveler primarily focuses on the efforts of Jay Burchell (Matt Bomer) and Tyler Fog (Logan Marshall-Green), two college graduates who must prove their innocence after being framed for the bombing of a museum by their former roommate Will Traveler (Aaron Stanford). The two must evade the FBI, led by Special Agent in Charge Fred Chambers (Steven Culp). Special Agents Jan Marlow (Viola Davis) and Guillermo Borjes (Anthony Ruivivar) actively hunt the two, although Marlow questions the duo's purported guilt.

Over the course of the show, Jay and Tyler uncover a conspiracy that involves Jack Freed (Neal McDonough) of the Department of Homeland Security and even Carlton Fog (William Sadler), Tyler's father and a very successful businessman. Occasionally assisting Tyler and Jay is a mysterious man dubbed the Porter (Billy Mayo). Meanwhile, Kim Doherty (Pascale Hutton), Jay's girlfriend, must cope with harassment from both the FBI and the public.

At the end of the third episode, "New Haven", Will Traveler is revealed to be alive. Appearing as his girlfriend Maya is Sonja Bennett.

== Episodes ==
ABC originally ordered the season with 13 episodes, but on October 28, 2006, the network scaled it back to eight episodes. The pilot episode aired at 10 P.M. on May 10, and repeated on May 30, 2007, immediately followed by the episode "The Retreat" in its regular time slot of Wednesday at 10 P.M. Eastern/9 P.M. Central. "The Retreat" was shown again on July 4, 2007, and then a new episode the following week, due to the Fourth of July holiday.

No.	Title	Directed by	Written by	Original release date	U.S. viewers (millions)
1	"Pilot"	David Nutter	David DiGilio	May 10, 2007	8.61
Jay Burchell and Tyler Fog become the prime suspects after the New York Drexler Museum is bombed. To Jay and Tyler, all evidence points to their friend Will Traveler but when the FBI comes after them, they learn that the friend they knew never existed on record. To make matters worse, it seems that Will died during the bombing. After a tense chase through New York, Jay and Tyler manage to escape and set about uncovering the truth and clearing their name.
2	"The Retreat"	Fred Gerber	David DiGilio	May 30, 2007	6.28
Jay and Tyler manage to reach the retreat of Tyler's father, Carlton, who is a wealthy businessman has had his own trouble with the law. The senior Fog manages to convince Jay and Tyler to follow the directions of John Ellington, who works for a special kind of security firm. Jay and Tyler comply but Ellington turns on them on the road and aims to kill them. They narrowly escape.
3	"New Haven"	Marcos Siega	Charlie Craig	June 6, 2007	5.30
Jay and Tyler return to their old home of New Haven in the hope that they can uncover more information about Will and why he set them up. Instead, they must evade the police. At the end of the episode it is revealed that Will Traveler is alive, on his own, and carrying one of the paintings from the bombed museum.
4	"The Out"	Guy Ferland	Norman Morrill	June 13, 2007	4.07
Jay and Tyler make their way to Deer Harbor, Maine, Will's hometown. There they meet Maya, Will's girlfriend, who reveals more about Will's past and the fact that they both worked for a secret organization. The duo's new clue is a key to a security box in Boston.
5	"The Tells"	Sergio Mimica-Gezzan	Michael Alaimo	June 20, 2007	4.47
In Boston, Jay and Tyler unlock the security box and find various items such as fake passports and a gun that further connects Will to the bombing. Meanwhile, Will is captured and interrogated by his bosses, who threaten Maya's life. Under pressure, Will reveals the events of the day of the Drexler bombing and his plan to leave the country with Maya after the job had been done. However, to Will's anger, it is revealed that Maya has already been killed. The FBI manage to capture a new suspect, who hints to a far greater conspiracy.
6	"The Trader"	Fred Gerber	Eli Talbert	June 27, 2007	3.86
Jay and Tyler return to New York hoping to uncover new information. When Tyler visits his father, more is revealed and Carlton is revealed to be involved with the conspiracy. Meanwhile, Will turns further against his employers, moving to bring them down and avenge the death of his girlfriend.
7	"The Reunion"	Tim Matheson	Vanessa Reisen	July 11, 2007	3.55
Still in New York, Jay and Tyler go their separate ways after an argument. Jay and his girlfriend Kim reunite. However, when they move to bring evidence to the FBI, Tyler must stop them after finding out that someone in the FBI is involved with the terrorist plot. Will also travels to New York as he continues his quest to take down his former employers. At the end of the episode, the three friends reunite.
8	"The Exchange"	Paul A. Edwards	Henry Robles	July 18, 2007	3.86
In the final episode of the series, Will, Jay and Tyler work together to bring down the conspiracy that ruined their lives. The traitor within the FBI is also revealed. But just when Will, Jay and Tyler manage to gather the evidence they need to clear their names, including the man responsible (Jack Freed), the limousine carrying Freed and the evidence explodes in the series' cliffhanger.

== Reception ==
=== Critical reception ===
Traveler was met with mixed reviews. At Metacritic, the show has a rating of 53%, calculated from 17 reviews.

Robert Bianco of USA Today was positive about the show, saying "the show seems faster, brighter and more entertaining than most of the serials that beat it to the punch this fall." Bianco was nonetheless worried about Traveler's future both because of its subject matter and airing in the summer. Variety reporter Brian Lowry noted similar concerns and praised the actors, writing that Traveler "channels the old Hitchcockian standby of normal-guy-thrust-into-fabulous-plot scenario, with the central duo exhibiting realistic levels of fear, desperation and resourcefulness."

In contrast, Ray Richmond of The Hollywood Reporter reacted negatively to the show's "implausible" premise and finding that its protagonists "aren't nearly compelling enough to care a lot about." David Bianculli of the Daily News (New York) similarly called the premise "ridiculous" and called the show "nothing to see", negatively comparing it to The Fugitive.

=== Episode ratings ===
Episode #	Title	Air Date	Rating	Share	18-49	Viewers (millions)	Weekly Rank
1	"Pilot"	May 10, 2007	5.9	10	3.5/10	8.61	38/98
2	"The Retreat"	May 30, 2007	4.2	7	2.1/6	6.28	29/90
3	"New Haven"	June 6, 2007	3.7	6	1.7/5	5.30	41/93
4	"The Out"	June 13, 2007	2.9	5	1.3/4	4.07	54/95
5	"The Tells"	June 20, 2007	3.0	5	1.6/5	4.47	43/96
6	"The Trader"	June 27, 2007	2.6	5	1.3/4	3.86	67/99
7	"The Reunion"	July 11, 2007	2.5	5	1.2/3	3.55	73/102
8	"The Exchange"	July 18, 2007	2.7	5	1.4/4	3.86	73/104

- Ratings for episode 6 are overnight figures; all others are final numbers.
- DVR numbers actually raised "The Reunion"'s ratings by 19.4% to around 4 million viewers.

=== Seasonal ratings ===
Seasonal ratings based on average total viewers per episode of Traveler on ABC:

Season	Timeslot (EDT)	Series Premiere	Series Finale	TV Season	Rank	Viewers (millions)
1	Thursday 10:00 P.M. (May 10, 2007) Wednesday 10:00 P.M. (May 30 - July 18, 2007)	May 10, 2007	July 18, 2007	2006-2007	#222	4.96
