= D.C. (TV series) =

- Genre: Drama
- Created by: Dick Wolf; John August
- Starring: Jacinda Barrett; Mark-Paul Gosselaar; Kristanna Loken; Gabriel Olds; Daniel Sunjata
- Composer: Joseph Conlan
- Country of origin: United States
- Original language: English
- No. of seasons: 1
- No. of episodes: 7 (3 unaired) (list of episodes)

Production
- Executive producers: Dick Wolf; James Andrew Miller; Peter Jankowski; Arthur W. Forney
- Producer: John L. Roman
- Production locations: Toronto, Ontario, Canada
- Running time: 60 minutes
- Production companies: Wolf Films; Studios USA Television

Original release
- Network: The WB
- Release: April 2 – April 23, 2000

D.C. is an American drama television series created by Dick Wolf and John August that ran from April 2 to 23, 2000 on The WB. The series follows five young interns in Washington, D.C. as they navigate their careers and lives in the nation's capital.

Initially titled D.C. Interns, the series was given a 13-episode order in May 1999 to debut as a midseason replacement. However, on November 17, 1999, The WB announced that the series' 13-episode order was reduced to seven – effectively shutting down production – due to the success of the network's fall lineup, and the departure of August.

== Cast and characters ==
- Gabriel Olds as Mason Scott, a young man fresh out of college who has dreamed his entire life of coming to the city to make a difference.
- Mark-Paul Gosselaar as Pete Komisky, Mason's best friend and a lobbyist who understands the questionable morality of the political system in D.C.
- Jacinda Barrett as Finley Scott, Mason's sister who dropped out of graduate school.
- Daniel Sunjata as Lewis Freeman, a Supreme Court clerk.
- Kristanna Loken as Sarah Logan, Lewis's girlfriend and a junior field producer for a cable news station.

=== Recurring ===
- John Benjamin Hickey as Congressman Rob Owens
- Kenneth Welsh as Neil
- Daniel McDonald as Dryder

=== Notable guest stars ===
- Len Cariou as Senator William Abbott ("Pilot")
- Tom McCarthy as Joseph Scott ("Truth")
- Melissa McCarthy as Molly ("Justice", "Blame")
- Joanna Cassidy as Lewis' boss ("Justice")

== Episodes ==
No.	Title	Directed by	Written by	Original release date	Prod. code
1	"Pilot"	Todd Holland & Michael Fields	John August	April 2, 2000	001
Mason's twin sister Finley arrives from college to stay with him. She manages to get a big house with an extra that they decide to put up for rent. Pete, a friend of Mason's who is living with them, runs into an old friend from high school who is now a reporter. She needs a place to stay, and he offers her the extra room in the house, so she moves in with her boyfriend Lewis. Mason gets fired from his job after his superior takes his work and screws everything.
2	"Truth"	John Whitesell	John August	April 9, 2000	002
Pete and Mason's friendship is put at risk when they find themselves competing for the same job. Pete accuses Mason of not wanting the job, something Mason takes offensively, but realizes it's true. Pete doesn't get the job, and Mason doesn't even want to know the results. Their friendship is more important than any job. Meanwhile, Sarah is asked to cover a parking ticket story for her co-worker, and with Finley's help she turns it into an investigative story about diplomatic immunity. Finley and Mason's parents visit, and Finley refuses to obey their wishes of her returning to college. She later discovers that her parents’ marriage might be a charade.
3	"Justice"	Michael Fields	John August	April 16, 2000	003
A neighbor tries to blackmail them for renting the extra room and not telling the real owners. They secretly videotape him so they can do the same thing to him. Lewis's cousin gets arrested and he tries to help the kid. His cousin is convinced to turn in his friend and get murdered, leaving Lewis feeling responsible. Mason has a date with a girl that once slept with Pete. He also has a chance to beat his old boss who fired him at softball.
4	"Blame"	Scott Paulin	Daniel Cerone	April 23, 2000	004
When a girl is brutally murdered by three classmates, Mason suggests to Congressman Owens that parental responsibility in such crimes is something he should take a stand on. Owens thinks it's a great idea, and has Mason start writing an amendment while setting up a press conference with the dead girl's parents. Sarah leverages her relationship with Mason to get an exclusive interview with the parents, making herself look good to her network. Mason is upset when Sarah's questions lead the couple to admit that they don't really support parental responsibility. Mason's job is on the line, but he redeems himself by rewriting the amendment for Owens with an eye toward not unfairly blaming good parents with bad kids. Meanwhile, Sarah is troubled that she lied to the parents and said that she had recently lost a cousin close to her to violent crime to get them to open up. Pete gets a new high-powered job more on the merit of his sexual charm than anything else. Finley gets a job at the Smithsonian after showing a tour guide up with her knowledge of and excitement about history.
5	"Party"	Joe Berlinger	Matt Pyken & Michael Berns	Unaired	007
Finley decides to host a party at the house, an idea that doesn't exactly excite her roommates. Pete is frustrated that Dryden didn't invite him to his fancy party, so he offers to help with Finley's, but in the last minute, Dryden invites him, and afraid to disappoint Finley, Pete decides to attend both parties. When Sarah, who's having relationship problems with Lewis, hears that Pete's going to Dryden's party, she tags along with him and runs into an old college classmate of hers. Finley's party is a total disaster, and Pete sees more than he should of Dryden's personal life.
6	"Trust"	TBD	Matt Pyken & Michael Berns	Unaired	005
7	"Guns 'n' Roses"	Kristoffer Tabori	James Andrew Miller	Unaired	006
Two thieves break into the house, steal several electronic devices, and knock Sarah unconscious. All the roommates are scared of being alone in the house, and Dryder sees that as an opportunity to manipulate Pete into taking charge of one of their major accounts – a gun factory. Dryden gets Pete a gun, something all the roommates but Sarah disapprove of. When they hear a strange noise coming from the kitchen, the gun is put at proof, and Pete realizes maybe it's not such a safe idea after all. Meanwhile, Finley's heavily worked, much anticipated exhibit at the museum turns into a social problem due to an old picture in which slaves appear smiling – something the African Americans (especially Lewis) take offensively. Finley bravely manages to turn the situation around and keep the exhibit from being shut down. She also has problems with Ben, and breaks up with him after seeing his children.
