= Side Order of Life =

- Created by: Margaret Nagle
- Written by: Margaret Nagle
- Starring: Marisa Coughlan; Diana-Maria Riva; Christopher Gartin; Erika Alexander; Jason Priestley
- Country of origin: United States
- No. of seasons: 1
- No. of episodes: 13

Production
- Executive producers: Bruce Cohen; Dan Jinks; Margaret Nagle
- Running time: 1 hour (with ads)
- Production companies: The Jinks/Cohen Company; Warner Horizon Television

Original release
- Network: Lifetime Television
- Release: July 15 – October 7, 2007

Side Order of Life is an American drama television series broadcast by Lifetime on Sunday night. It premiered on Lifetime on July 15, 2007. In its first five weeks it aired at 8:00pm ET/PT, then switched to the 9:00pm time slot. Lifetime broadcast Side Order of Life with State of Mind and Army Wives in an effort to offer a night of new original programming aimed primarily at female viewers during the summer hiatus. Initial reviews were positive.

Lifetime declined to renew Side Order of Life for a second season.

== Premise ==
Jenny McIntyre (Marisa Coughlan) has a nightmare about her wedding day in Side Order of Life

Marisa Coughlan plays Jenny McIntyre, a photographer who reconsiders her life and is reawakened to her options after her best friend, Vivy Porter (Diana-Maria Riva), is diagnosed with a recurrence of cancer. Jason Priestley returns to regular series television as Ian Denison, Jenny's fiancé. Christopher Gartin rounds out the main cast as Jenny's boss Rick Purdy at the fictional In Person magazine; he is in love with Vivy, who has rejected him.

== Cast ==
=== Main ===
- Marisa Coughlan as Jenny McIntyre, a photojournalist at In Person magazine.
- Diana-Maria Riva as Vivy Porter, Jenny's best friend, who is currently undergoing treatment for cancer.
- Christopher Gartin as Rick Purdy, editor of In Person magazine, and secretly in love with Vivy
- Erika Alexander as Colette
- Jason Priestley as Ian Denison, Jenny's ex-fiancé, engaged to Becca despite warnings from friends about rebound relationships
- Ashley Williams as Becca, Vivy's 'other best friend', who dated Ian in college, engaged to Ian currently.

In a moment of candor, when discussing his role on a female-oriented show on a female-oriented network, Jason Priestley referred to himself as "the man-meat," but stated, "I'm ok with that."

=== Recurring ===
- Steven Weber (uncredited in episodes 1–12) as Cell Phone Man, whom Jenny called by accident when trying to reach Ian, and who she continued to call for reassurance and support.
- Joe Regalbuto as Mr. McIntyre, Jenny's father, and a good friend of Ian's, even after the breakup.
- Susan Blakely as Margot, Jenny's mother, a self-described trophy wife.
- Lisa Waltz as Dr. Misty Raines, Vivy's Oncologist, who also has cancer.
- Paula Jai Parker as Stargell Grant
- Ron Fassler as Teddy Smalls
- Ian Ziering as Brian Fowler

== Episodes ==
No.	Title	Directed by	Written by	Original release date	Prod. code
1	"Pilot"	James Frawley	Margaret Nagle	July 15, 2007	101
Jenny McIntyre, a photographer for In Person magazine, is days away from getting married, and is starting to have nightmares and become a little bit of a bridezilla. In the middle of her doubts about her own upcoming wedding, she is assigned to work on a story about a woman who has married three men, in part because she "loves weddings." Jenny leaves the assignment, promising to come back later, and is blindsided when her best friend, Vivy announces that her cancer has returned, and it is in her brain. Vivy demands that Jenny reassess everything in her life, especially her engagement to Ian. Jenny refuses, but over the course of the episode has no choice, as her subconscious starts to provide a running, involuntary reassessment for her. She also connects with a mysterious stranger when she misdials Ian's number.
2	"Whose Sperm is it Anyway?"	James Frawley	Margaret Nagle	July 22, 2007	102
Jenny is assigned a photo shoot with a high-profile Hollywood couple. In exchange for a $2 million donation to their favorite charity, the couple is permitting In Person to print a spread of pictures of their baby. In a fantasy sequence, the baby discusses with Jenny her ongoing relationship problems. Jenny discovers pregnancy pillows hanging in the nursery armoire and realizes the child was born via a surrogate mother. Her plan to expose the parents falls by the wayside after she and the mother engage in a conversation in which the actress reveals how much motherhood means to her. In a parallel story, Ian and Rick vie for the opportunity to father Vivy's child with Jenny as the surrogate, in the hope the stem cells from the umbilical cord can help with Vivy's cancer treatment. The plan ends when Jenny and Vivy mutually agree it's not feasible. Jenny's phone relationship continues as she seeks counsel from the nameless stranger on the other end. In the episode's final scene, Jenny and Ian decide to separate, then fall into a passionate embrace that suggests neither is ready to give up just yet.
3	"Separation Anxiety"	Dan Lerner	Liz Tigelaar	July 29, 2007	103
Jenny is assigned an article and photo shoot about conjoined twins who are about to undergo surgery to separate them. When she arrives at the hospital, she discovers they have decided to forgo the operation, given the odds that one will not survive are fairly high and neither wants to lose the other. Jenny suggests they view the surgery as an opportunity for one to allow the other to live instead of both dying, which is a given without the operation. They follow her advice, and subsequently one dies. A second plotline involves Becca (guest star Ashley Williams), Vivy's friend from San Francisco, who comes to town to spend time with her. Jenny is jealous that she's in the picture, and her feelings intensify when she learns Becca and Ian went out for drinks. Jenny finally takes a stand re: what has become a somewhat ambiguous relationship with Ian and returns her engagement ring to him.
4	"What Price Truth?"	Patrick Norris	Wendy Goldman	August 5, 2007	104
Seeking comfort following her breakup with Ian, Jenny impulsively buys an $1800 designer handbag while shopping with her overbearing mother (Susan Blakely). When Vivy vehemently reacts to the purchase as a feeble attempt to compensate for her breakup with Ian by filling her life with unnecessary material goods, Jenny donates the bag to a charity shop. Other plot lines involved Jenny introducing an F. Scott Fitzgerald fan/historian to a carpenter who discovered one of the writer's diaries in an old desk he purchased; the two discover they have something in common when they meet after he sells the diary at auction for $800,000. Becca decides to remain in Los Angeles and invites Ian to dinner; he declines, then changes his mind after he and Jenny have an unpleasant meeting while tending to Vivy after a chemotherapy session. While dining out alone, Jenny calls her phone friend who, unbeknownst to her, is seated at the bar waiting for a take-out order in the same restaurant.
5	"The Early Bird Catches the Word"	James Frawley	Barry Safchik & Michael Platt	August 12, 2007	105
Assigned a story about a teenaged whiz kid (Cody Kasch), winner of a word definition bee, Jenny succeeds in reuniting him with his estranged mother. She discovers her father's regular deposits into her bank account are the results of investments he made with the money she won while unwillingly participating in childhood beauty pageants at the behest of her mother. Vivy has a date with the visiting editor of In Person's sister publication in Mexico, much to Rick's dismay. Jenny's date with her mysterious phone friend is postponed when Vivy, suffering anxiety due to a partial hair loss resulting from increased chemotherapy treatment, calls upon her for comfort.
6	"Children and Art"	Dan Lerner	Paula Yoo	August 19, 2007	106
Jenny volunteers to write a story about up-and-coming Vietnamese artist Amh Thuy, but soon discovers her mother's background story is far more interesting. Rick volunteers to be a Big Brother to a young Hispanic boy who hopes to use the program as a means of finding a husband for his mother. He decides Rick isn't a viable candidate when he sees him interact with Vivy and correctly perceives his feelings for her run deep. Jenny discovers her father forfeited a promising career as an artist in order to raise a family. Ian and Becca take the next step in their developing relationship. Jenny's phone friend calls, tells her he thinks he's falling in love with her, and promises they'll meet as soon as he returns from a business trip. Previews of the next episode suggest he may not be the hunk Jenny has imagined him to be.
7	"Try to Remember"	Dan Lerner	Margaret Nagle	August 26, 2007	108
Prompted by an interview with a doctor who theorizes that one's first love sets one's course in life and lasts forever, Jenny searches for her own. She discovers he's an award-winning photojournalist and contacts him via his website. Coincidentally he's in Los Angeles and the two reunite. He confesses he still has feelings for her and invites Jenny to take a sabbatical from work and travel with him around the world. She accepts, then declines after giving the matter more thought. Vivy is diagnosed with medicinal menopause and her doctor prescribes unusual treatment to counteract the symptoms. Rick meets with Jenny's mother and is amazed to find her blatantly flirting with him.
8	"When Pigs Fly"	Allison Liddi-Brown	Cathryn Michon	September 9, 2007	107
An article about an allegedly heroic pig (who keeps sending her text messages) leads Jenny to an undocumented Haitian obstetrician who serves as his remote rural community's midwife, and she helps him acquire the paperwork he needs to remain in the States. Vivy discovers her oncologist is battling a rare and usually fatal form of leukemia and promises to help her plan her estate and manage it after her death. At Vivy's urging, Jenny agrees to accept a date from the next person who asks, and it turns out to be her neighbor's 80-year-old father (Paul Dooley), whose life she saves when he suffers a coronary attack during their evening out. He subsequently tells her he can't see her anymore because she's unable to give him the serious relationship he wants.
9	"Coming Out"	David Paymer	Wendy Goldman	September 16, 2007	109
It's debutante season, and Jenny is assigned a story about Dylan Graham, a young debutante at UCLA and daughter of a gubernatorial candidate. While trying to figure out what is disturbing the deb, she meets with her father for lunch, on his birthday. Her father is reticent, though he appreciates her gift of a camera, and hints vaguely that he is about to make a change in his life. Jenny meets with Vivy, Rick, Ian and Becca to have drinks and dinner before going to cover a 'pre-deb party' of Dylan's. Becca, trying very hard to impress, burns dinner while comparing Jenny's poise to 'Jackie O'. Jenny heads to the party, and, in the middle of it, Dylan is arrested for stealing several thousand dollars of merchandise while being videotaped. As she is bundled into the car, she asks Jenny to take a picture of her. Confused by Dylan's behaviour, Jenny turns to the photographs she took of her, and in them, Dylan confesses to being in love with her best friend, Hannah. Meanwhile, Jenny's father has given Ian the Mustang that they had been working on. Concerned, he goes to see Jenny, and they wind up in bed together, but Jenny stops things before they do more than kiss. Jenny speaks to Dylan, and tells her to live her life in a way she won't regret. Ian confesses to Becca about the incident with Jenny, increasing her doubts that she can't keep up with his history with Jenny. Jenny apologizes to Becca, and Dylan meets with Hannah (shot silently, at a distance, while a song by The Indigo Girls plays). Mr. McIntyre leaves a note that reads 'Margot' on a workbench, and drives off on his motorcycle.
10	"Awakenings"	Perry Lang	Barry Safchik & Michael Platt	September 23, 2007	110
Peri Gilpin guest stars as 'the Coma Whisperer', a nurse who has a gift for bringing comatose patients out of their comas. Ian Ziering also guest stars.
11	"Aliens"	Lee Shallat-Chemel	Tom Garrigus	September 30, 2007	111
Jenny is assigned an article on a woman who has filed for a divorce, believing that her husband's body is possessed by an alien. Brian (guest star Ian Ziering) tries to tell Jenny that he is 'not who you think I am,' and reveals he is separated from his wife, and has two children.
12	"Nothing Left to Lose"	Nick Marck	Margaret Nagle & Wendy Goldman	October 7, 2007	112
Dr. Raines is to be the subject of an In Person Magazine article on heroes when she goes missing, wanted as a result of trying several experimental anti-cancer treatments on herself without approval.
13	"Funeral for a Phone"	Ron Lagomarsino	Margaret Nagle	October 7, 2007	113
On the advice of her psychiatrist (guest star Carrie Fisher), Jenny buries her cell phone and attempts to forget 'Cell Phone Man'. Rick assigns her a piece for In Person on a blind man who is restoring classic music pieces for digital use. When her psychiatrist recommends she make an effort to stop seeing things that aren't there as she develops her pictures, she turns to him, and he tells her not to let anyone give up her gift. Cell Phone Man (Steven Weber is revealed) returns from China and has his sister, a police detective, trace Jenny's phone. He shows up at In Person, where Becca is using Jenny's phone. Becca refers to her fiancé, Ian, and Cell Phone Man, believing Becca to be Jenny, and that she is back with Ian, leaves. After Jenny ceases to see the psychiatrist, Vivy reveals that she unburied Jenny's phone, giving it back to her when Jenny comes to help her makeup at the wedding. Cell Phone Man shows up at the wedding, and objects during the ceremony. Jenny overhears him, and reveals herself from the back of the church, leading him outside. In each other's arms, Cell Phone Man introduces himself as 'James', and they kiss.

== Reception ==
Initial reviews were positive, with Variety's Brian Lowry saying, "writer-producer Margaret Nagle brings a level of wit to the proceedings superior to most chick-lit-inspired TV drama." The Seattle Times, after describing the premise, said, "If this all sounds kind of corny, well, it kind of is until you realize the story line hits its mark, making you recall your own missteps and regrets for not having taken better charge."

The Boston Herald stated that "Lifetime's new dramedy Side Order of Life wants to be the next Grey's Anatomy so badly, it even borrows Meredith's TV dad for the debut," but despite the content of the review, rated it a 'B' and said it was "almost satisfying."
