= Three Bags Full =

2005 novel by Leonie Swann

- Hardcover edition
- Author: Leonie Swann
- Original title: Glennkill: Ein Schafskrimi
- Translator: English: Anthea Bell
- Language: German
- Genre: Detective novel
- Publisher: English: Transworld Publishers, Doubleday, Random House; Germany: Goldmann
- Publication date: 2005
- Publication place: Germany
- English publication date: 2006
- Pages: 368 pp
- ISBN: 0-385-60994-9
- OCLC: 64312670

Three Bags Full: A Sheep Detective Story (original German title: Glennkill: Ein Schafskrimi) is a 2005 novel by Leonie Swann. It is a detective story featuring a flock of Irish sheep out to solve the murder of their shepherd. Written originally in German, the novel became an international bestseller, and has been translated into more than 30 languages.

== Plot ==
In the Irish village of Glenkill, George Glenn is a shepherd who is a loner, estranged from his wife, and is fond only of his sheep. Every day, after he lets them out to graze, he reads to them from romance adventure novels and textbooks on sheep diseases, and he promises that one day he will take them to Europe. One day, the sheep find George dead, pinned to the ground by a spade. Miss Maple considers herself the "cleverest sheep in all of Glenkill" and encourages the sheep to investigate the murder.

Mopple, a "meat breed" sheep that George rescued, is the memory sheep of the flock and the main one who can hold events in his head longer than a brief period. Othello is a black ram rescued from the circus. Sir Ritchfield is the lead ram who has a lost twin brother named Melmoth, who has become legendary in the flock. The core group help Miss Maple investigate the murder.

A new shepherd, Gabriel, soon brings his sheep to graze near the flock, and while they are initially hopeful about getting a new shepherd, they quickly grow to dislike Gabriel due to his lack of interest in reading them stories. A conversation with his flock reveals that Gabriel raises them for slaughter. This revelation leads Mopple to develop an intense phobia of Ham, the town butcher.

Led by Miss Maple, the sheep travel into town and spy in people's windows in order to gain information on George. Their exploits lead the church priest, who the sheep mistakenly believe to be named God, and Ham the butcher to think they are being haunted by George's sheep, particularly Othello, who as a black ram looks satanic.

Rebecca, George's estranged daughter, returns to reconnect with George and discovers she is too late. The sheep grow immediately fond of her. Beth, a Bible-obsessed woman who frequently attempted to convert George, is among the most devastated of the townspeople and gives information on George's estrangement from his family.

Sir Ritchfield begins exhibiting strange behavior, until it is revealed that his twin brother, Melmoth, has returned, and the sheep have been mistaking his identity. Melmoth and Ritchfield joyfully reunite, and Melmoth tells the story of how he left. One day while he had wandered off from the flock, George and Ham discover the dead body of a man named Wesley McCarthy, who was hated by the town and they believe was killed as part of a conspiracy they weren't in on. This led to Ham's paranoia of the townspeople. Melmoth begins teaching the sheep how to focus and how to resist being herded, skills he learned from his wanderings. Othello was taught by Melmoth at his time trapped in the circus, which enables him to fight off dogs' attempts to herd him. The rest of the flock work to learn to fight back.

George's will is read in court, in which it is revealed that he set money aside so the sheep could get a trip to Europe. Gabriel offers to be the one to take them, to the sheep's dismay. They gather around Rebecca in the court room and she is given custody. To their delight, she continues the storytelling tradition according to the demands of the will and begins reading them Wuthering Heights.

Wuthering Heights gives Miss Maple inspiration for the answer to the murder mystery. Knowing that Beth was obsessed with souls, she concludes that Beth is the murderer, trying to steal George's soul and planting a spade in him to prevent his ghost from taking vengeance. The sheep conspire to reveal this to the townspeople.

Glenkill hosts an annual "Smartest Sheep in Glenkill" contest as a tourist trap. Mopple, Othello, Miss Maple, and a sheep named Zora attend, putting on a play that re-enacts George's murder. Mopple is chased by Ham, who believes Mopple is tormenting him, but he stands up to Ham and overcomes his phobia. The townspeople fail to understand the play, but Beth recognizes a cloth of hers that the sheep brought and confesses the truth of George's death. Beth had fallen deeply in love with George. George became suicidal through his isolation and confessed his intentions to kill himself to her. He begged her to plant the spade in his body, which she did. As the sheep prepare to leave, Ham approaches Mopple one final time and gives him his respect.

The mystery solved, the sheep are hailed in the town's newspapers for helping uncover the truth. They prepare to travel to Europe with Rebecca, their new shepherd. Melmoth leaves before they go, as he prefers a life on his own. Sir Ritchfield steps down as lead ram due to his age, and Othello takes over leadership, having learned from Melmoth.

== Characters ==
=== Sheep ===
- Miss Maple: Known as the smartest sheep in Glenkill, she leads the investigation into George's death.
- Sir Ritchfield: Head ram, sometimes seems to have a wandering mind. Forgets things easily, especially when worked up over something.
- Othello: The literal black sheep of the flock, is somewhat mysterious. He has not been with the flock long, and hints at a dark and troubled past.
- Mopple the Whale: A merino who remembers everything, and likes to eat.
- Zora: A pensive black-faced ewe with a weakness for clouds and abysses.
- Melmoth: Sir Ritchfield's long-lost twin brother.

=== Humans ===
Below is a list of notable human characters and their roles. Contains plot details.

- George Glenn: The shepherd of the flock. He is lonely, depressed, suicidal and feels lost. George is married to Kate, but the two are estranged and live separately. George has an adult daughter, Rebecca; but he has no relationship with her. Before his death, he wrote a letter to Rebecca. George is a drug trafficker. He uses the sheep as mules to transport marijuana. Unlike the townspeople, George is not interested in expanding the tourist market in his town of Glenkill. With his friend Ham the butcher, George discovered the dead body of McCarthy.
- Kate: Once caught in a love triangle between George and the butcher Ham, Kate married George. She gained weight after marriage. Ham continues to love her and pine for her.
- Beth Jameson: A devout Christian missionary who lives alone. She left Glenkill for a mission in Africa; and, when she returned, everything had changed. An anxious woman, Beth smells bad to the sheep. After George's sheep reenact his murder at the Mad Boar Pub, Beth speaks to the audience and reveals that George came to her before his death. George told Beth his plans of suicide. After his suicide, Beth drove the spade through his body, as George requested.
- Abraham Rackham (Ham): The local butcher and one of George's few friends. Together with George, he discovered the body of McCarthy. Ham loves George's wife, Kate, and installs cameras at his shop so that he can record the moments when she visits his shop. One misty day after George's death, Ham tries to steal a sheep from George's flock, falls off a cliff and is paralyzed.
- Father William: The sheep name Father William 'God' as he lives in 'God's house'. He sees the sheep around town and in his church conducting their investigation and becomes very fearful of them.
- Inspector Holmes: An ineffective investigator. He does not solve George's murder case, or the McCarthy murder case.
- Gabriel: A shepherd with a flock of sheep raised for mutton. George's sheep like him at first and consider him to be a good shepherd, until they learn that he raises his sheep to be slaughtered, not for wool like George did. Gabriel is motivated by money, and the sheep consider him to be the "head ram" of the humans in Glennkill.
- Josh Baxter: The landlord of the Mad Boar pub. Josh Baxter is interested in expanding the tourist trade in Glenkill because he will benefit financially.
- Tom O'Malley: An alcoholic who finds the dead body of George the shepherd. During the smartest sheep contest, Tom is drunk and correctly understands that George's sheep are acting out his murder.
- The 'Master Hunter': This character is never named by the author or by the human characters in the story. The sheep call him the master hunter and ultimately recognize him to be Gabriel by his smell.
- Rebecca: George's daughter. She volunteers to take the flock of sheep to Europe. Because the sheep choose her over Gabriel, she inherits the flock and shepherding duties. Before his death, George sent her a letter. She intentionally delayed a reply and regretted that decision after his death.

== Themes ==
Largely humorous in character, the novel displays a strong knowledge of sheep behavior, biology, husbandry and breeds (Cladoir, Merino, Mountain Blackface, and Hebridean are present). Using the perspective of the flock, Swann makes comedic jabs at human character and institutions.

== Sequel ==
A sequel, titled Garou: Ein Schaf-Thriller [de], was released in Germany in June 2010. It is a detective novel but also a thriller. In it, the sheep travel to France with Rebecca and try to uncover a mystery about a werewolf. In 2025, Soho Press published an English edition of Garou, titled Big Bad Wool, translated by Amy Bojang, along with an audiobook narrated by Caroline Lennon. A third novel, titled Widdersehen: Ein Schafskrimi, was released in Germany in April 2026.

== Reception ==
According to Kirkus Reviews, the sheep characters outshine the human ones, and "the sustained tone of straight-faced wonderment is magical". A review by Ian Sansom for The Guardian praised Swann for "gnawing" and "wriggling" her way into a gap in the anthropomorphized animal detective novel, thereby succeeding to avoid hackneyed "gumshoe" tropes. Jane Jakeman, writing for The Independent, in a rave review, found the sheep to be a successful and appealing parable for humanity, and concluded that the book has "charm without whimsy, and is touching without being sentimental". Publishers Weekly called Three Bags Full "refreshingly original", and observed that Swann's "sheep's-eye view and the animals' literal translation of the strange words and deeds of the human species not only create laugh-out-loud humor but also allow the animals occasional flashes of accidental brilliance".

== Film adaptation ==
A film adaptation titled The Sheep Detectives that is directed by Kyle Balda, written by Craig Mazin, and starring Hugh Jackman, among others, was released theatrically in May 2026.

== Audiobooks ==
German audiobook versions of Glennkill and Garou, read by Andrea Sawatzki, were published by Random House Audio in 2005 and 2010.

An English version of the audiobook read by Josephine Bailey was released in 2007. A second English version read by Caroline Lennon was published in February 2025.
