= Leonie Swann =

German writer

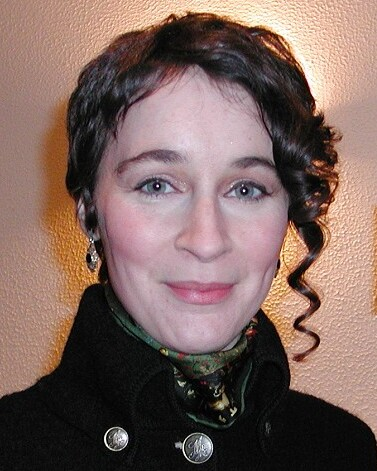
Leonie Swann, 2006

Leonie Swann (born 1975) is a pseudonymous German crime writer.

== Life ==
Swann grew up near Munich, Germany. She studied philosophy, communications, and psychology at LMU Munich and the Munich School of Philosophy. She now resides near Cambridge, England.

== Career ==
Her first novel, Glennkill (published as Three Bags Full in English), sold over 100,000 copies in the first six months after publication. It has been translated to twenty-six languages.

After the success of her first novel, she paused studying for a PhD in English Literature in Berlin to write full-time.

Her second novel, Garou, a sequel to Glennkill, is not a detective novel but a thriller. The English translation of the novel, titled Big Bad Wool, was released in May 2025.

== Bibliography ==
- Three Bags Full: A Sheep Detective Story (Glennkill: Ein Schafskrimi). Goldmann, Transworld Publishers, Doubleday, Random House, 2005
- Big Bad Wool. Allison & Busby, 2025. (Garou. Ein Schaf-Thriller. Goldmann, 2010)
- Dunkelsprung: Vielleicht kein Märchen. Goldmann, 2014
- Gray. Goldmann, 2017
- The Sunset Years of Agnes Sharp (Mord in Sunset Hall). Goldmann, 2020. Soho Press, 2023.
- Miss Sharp macht Urlaub. Goldmann, 2022
- Agnes Sharp and the Trip of a Lifetime. Soho Press, 2024.
- Widdersehen: Ein Schafskrimi. DUMONT Buchverlag, 2026.

== Awards ==
- 2006 - German Friedrich Glauser crime writing prize, "debut" category.
- 2006 - The Glennkill Cover came first in the Bloody Cover 2006 Awards.
- 2007 - German Buchliebling for the CD.

== Works ==
- Three Bags Full, Doubleday 2006, ISBN 0-385-60994-9
- Garou. Ein Schaf-Thriller, Goldmann, Munich 2010, ISBN 978-3-442-31224-5. (Original German edition). Translated as Big Bad Wool by Amy Bojang (2025).
- Dunkelsprung: Vielleicht kein Märchen, Goldmann, Munich 2014, ISBN 3-442-31387-2. (Original German edition, English translation not yet available)
- Gray, Goldmann, Munich 2017, ISBN 978-3-442-31443-0. (Original German edition, English translation not yet available)
- Mord in Sunset Hall, Goldmann, Munich 2020, ISBN 978-3-442-31556-7. (Original German edition). Translated as The Sunset Years of Agnes Sharp by Amy Bojang (2023).

== Adaptations ==
The Sheep Detectives, Amazon MGM Studios 2026, is an adaptation of Three Bags Full.
