= John August =

American film director and screenwriter (born 1970)

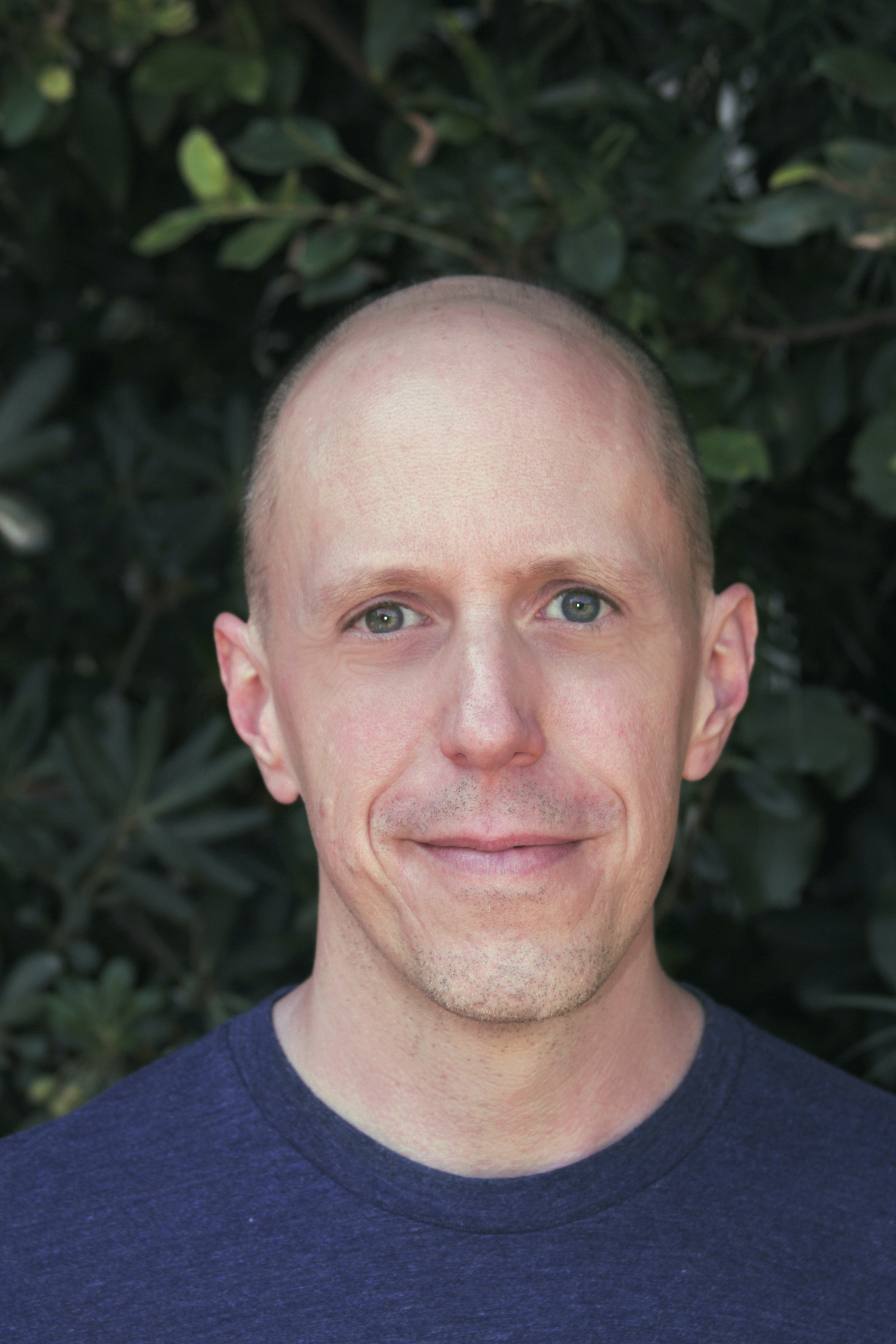
- August in 2019
- Born: John Tilton Meise; August 4, 1970 (age 56); Boulder, Colorado, U.S.
- Education: Drake University (BA); University of Southern California (MFA)
- Occupations: Screenwriter; director; producer; novelist
- Years active: 1998–present
- Notable work: Go; Big Fish; Charlie and the Chocolate Factory; Arlo Finch in the Valley of Fire
- Spouse: Michael August (m. 2008)
- Children: 1

John August (born August 4, 1970) is an American screenwriter, director, producer, and novelist. He is known for writing the films Go (1999), Charlie's Angels (2000), Charlie's Angels: Full Throttle (2003), Big Fish (2003), Charlie and the Chocolate Factory (2005), Corpse Bride (2005), Frankenweenie (2012), the Disney live-action adaptation of Aladdin (2019), the novels Arlo Finch in the Valley of Fire (2018), Arlo Finch in the Lake of the Moon (2019) and Arlo Finch in the Kingdom of Shadows (2020).

He hosts the screenwriting podcast Scriptnotes with Craig Mazin, maintains an eponymous screenwriting blog, and develops screenwriter-targeted software through his company, Quote-Unquote Apps.

August is a member of the Academy of Motion Picture Arts and Sciences, voting in the Writers branch. In 2016, he was awarded the WGAw's Valentine Davies Award for his dignified contributions to the entertainment industry and the community-at-large, and has been nominated for a BAFTA and a Grammy.

== Early life ==
August was born John Tilton Meise in Boulder, Colorado, in 1970. Meise is a German-language surname he found was difficult to pronounce and wished to change; he eventually settled on August, both his father's middle name and the month he was born. He earned a degree in journalism from Drake University in Des Moines, Iowa; while there, he participated in a summer film program at Stanford and decided to pursue screenwriting. He went on to earn an MFA in film from The Peter Stark Producing Program at the University of Southern California.

As part of his course at USC, August wrote a romantic tragedy called Here and Now. Though the script never sold, it resulted in August finding agent representation and helped launch his screenwriting career.

== Career ==
August's debut film was 1999's crime-comedy Go, directed by Doug Liman, for which he also served as co-producer and second unit director.

After Go finished filming, August and Melissa McCarthy, who had a small role in the film, ran into each other in a coffee shop, and August told McCarthy that he had written a short film with her in mind. The short film, God, was shot after Go, but finished and released before. It has been credited as one of the early showcases of McCarthy's comedic talent.

August created his first television show, D.C., in 2000 for The WB. The series was produced by Law & Order creator Dick Wolf, with August serving as co-executive producer. Seven episodes were produced, though only four aired. In the same year, August also wrote the animated science fiction feature Titan A.E., and the McG-directed Charlie's Angels.

In the fall of 1998, while Go was still in post-production, August had acquired the film rights to Daniel Wallace's novel Big Fish after reading it as a not-yet published manuscript. His adaptation became the 2003 Tim Burton film of the same name and earned August a 2003 BAFTA Award nomination for Best Adapted Screenplay.

He wrote the 2003 film sequel, Charlie's Angels: Full Throttle. August has spoken about the difficult production process for the film.

He reunited with Big Fish director Burton in 2005 for Charlie and the Chocolate Factory, an adaptation of Roald Dahl's children's book. August had written to Dahl as part of a third grade class project, and received a postcard reply. Though the reply was a form letter, August still had it, decades later, when he adapted the book. He earned a 2006 Grammy nomination for his lyrics for "Wonka's Welcome Song" from the film. He collaborated for a third time with Burton on the stop-motion animated fantasy Corpse Bride, also released in 2005. The two films were in production simultaneously, with actors including Johnny Depp, Helena Bonham Carter and Christopher Lee appearing in both. The film marked the third of five produced collaborations to date between August and Burton.

August made his feature directorial debut in 2007 with science fiction psychological thriller The Nines, starring Ryan Reynolds, Melissa McCarthy, Hope Davis and Elle Fanning. The film, which August also wrote, premiered at the 2007 Sundance Film Festival and Venice Film Festival's Critics' Week. One of McCarthy's characters in the film, Margaret, is the same one she played in August's 1998 short film God.

In 2010, he partnered with game designer Jordan Mechner to pitch an adaptation of Mechner's Prince of Persia. August served as an executive producer on the resulting film, Prince of Persia: The Sands of Time, directed by Mike Newell and produced by Jerry Bruckheimer.

He reunited with Burton again in 2012 for the stop-motion fantasy horror comedy Frankenweenie, a remake of Burton's 1984 short film of the same name. August also received story credit on Burton's Dark Shadows adaptation. August returned to Big Fish for a 2013 Broadway musical adaptation, with music and lyrics by Andrew Lippa, directed and choreographed by Susan Stroman.

August co-wrote the screenplay for Walt Disney Pictures' live action musical fantasy film Aladdin (2019), alongside director Guy Ritchie.

In July 2016, August signed a deal to write a three-book series aimed at middle-grade children, inspired by his experience as a Boy Scout. The first book in the series, Arlo Finch in the Valley of Fire, was published on February 6, 2018, by Roaring Brook Press, an imprint of the Macmillan Children's Publishing Group. Its origins and creation were documented in August's podcast Launch. Arlo Finch in the Lake of the Moon published in 2019, and the final book in the series followed in 2020.

== Awards ==
August was nominated for a BAFTA Award for Best Adapted Screenplay in 2003 for Big Fish. He earned a 2006 Grammy nomination for his lyrics for "Wonka's Welcome Song" from Charlie and the Chocolate Factory. In 2016, he was awarded the WGAw's Valentine Davies Award for his dignified contributions to the entertainment industry and the community-at-large.

== Other work ==
=== johnaugust.com ===
In 2003, August established johnaugust.com as a repository for the 100+ screenwriting advice columns he had written for IMDb. The site now has over 1,500 posts. August established a complementary site, screenwriting.io, to provide concise answers to a wide range of screenwriting craft-related questions.

=== Quote-Unquote Apps ===
He founded Quote-Unquote Apps in 2010, which develops software related to film and the film industry. Their releases include FDX Reader, an iOS application that displays Final Draft files; Less IMDb, a browser extension for Safari, Chrome, and Firefox that reorganizes the layout of IMDb pages; and Bronson Watermarker, an OS X watermarking application that supports multiple outputs. He also commissioned the typeface Courier Prime from Alan Dague-Greene, intended to be a more readable alternative to Courier New.

In 2012, the Quote-Unquote team, along with Stu Maschwitz, developed Fountain, a simple markup syntax for screenplays. Later that year, Quote-Unquote released the first public beta of Highland, an OS X utility that converts screenplays between PDF, FDX, and Fountain formats, and works as a Fountain text editor. In 2014, the company released Weekend Read, a freemium iOS app for reading screenplays. The app can open PDF, Final Draft, Fountain, Markdown and text files. iPad support was added in 2015. The app includes a 'For Your Consideration' section featuring awards season screenplays, as well as August's own scripts. In 2015, they released Assembler, a Mac app for instantly combining text files.

=== Podcasts ===
Since the summer of 2011, August and fellow screenwriter Craig Mazin have hosted the Scriptnotes podcast, a weekly podcast on screenwriting and the film industry. August debuted a second podcast in January 2018, titled Launch, a six-episode series produced by Wondery, which chronicles August's experience writing, selling, and releasing his debut novel, Arlo Finch in the Valley of Fire. On its first day of release, Launch reached the top 10 on the iTunes podcast chart.

=== Card games ===
August launched a 2014 Kickstarter for Writer Emergency Pack, a deck of cards designed to help writers when they're stuck. The Kickstarter raised $158,104 from 5,714 backers, and the pack is now for sale to the public. August worked with NaNoWriMo to distribute Writer Emergency Pack to more than 2,000 classrooms worldwide.

In May 2015, August launched a second Kickstarter for a card game called One Hit Kill. The Kickstarter raised $76,038 from 1,951 backers.

== Personal life ==
August lives in Los Angeles with his husband, Michael August, and their daughter. From 2016 to 2017, he spent a year living in Paris.

== Filmography ==
Film writer

Year	Title	Director	Notes
1998	God	Himself	Short film
1999	Go	Doug Liman	Also 2nd unit director and co-producer
2000	Titan A.E.	Don Bluth; Gary Goldman	
2000	Charlie's Angels	McG	
2003	Charlie's Angels: Full Throttle	McG	Nominated- Golden Raspberry Award for Worst Screenplay
2003	Big Fish	Tim Burton	Nominated- BAFTA Award for Best Adapted Screenplay
2005	Charlie and the Chocolate Factory	Tim Burton	Also wrote the lyrics to "Wonka's Welcome Song"
2005	Corpse Bride	Tim Burton; Mike Johnson	Also wrote the lyrics to "Remains of the Day", "Tears to Shed" and "According to Plan"
2007	The Nines	Himself	
2012	Dark Shadows	Tim Burton	Story only
2012	Frankenweenie	Tim Burton	
2019	Aladdin	Guy Ritchie	

Executive producer

- Prince of Persia: Sands of Time (2010)

Television

Year	Title	Writer	Executive Producer	Notes
2000	D.C.	Yes	Co-executive	Also creator
2003	Alaska	Yes	Yes	TV movie
