= James Andrew Miller =

American investigative journalist

- Born: New York, United States
- Education: Occidental College (BA); Oxford University (M. Litt.); Harvard University (MBA)
- Occupation: Journalist
- Known for: Reporting on Saturday Night Live and ESPN
- Website: jamesandrewmiller.com

James Andrew Miller is an American investigative journalist. He has worked for The Washington Post as a reporter, as special assistant and Chief Speechwriter to Senate Majority Leader Howard Baker, and executive VP of original programming for USA Network. He is known for his best selling books told in an oral history format of subjects including Saturday Night Live, ESPN, and the Creative Artists Agency.

== Career ==
After working for Senate Majority Leader Howard Baker, Miller wrote his first bestseller, Running in Place: Inside the Senate. He then attended Harvard Business School and obtained an MBA.

Over his career Miller refined an investigative journalism technique of crafting his books as oral histories where interviews unfold the history of a subject. Miller commented on his unique investigative style, "I love looking at organizations and studying and reporting on how they operate, what the culture is inside, and how the strategy changes over the course of a company’s life. You can give readers a sense of what goes on behind the curtains."

Saturday Night Live was the subject of Live From New York: The Complete, Uncensored History of Saturday Night Live as Told by Its Stars, Writers, and Guests and garnered Miller exposure as it spent 15 weeks on the New York Times bestseller list.

Miller has been called the 'historian' of ESPN and he released a detailed oral history in 2011 called Those Guys Have All the Fun: Inside the World of ESPN. He also interviewed former ESPN president John Skipper after his hasty exit from ESPN.

Miller's first book about Hollywood, Powerhouse: The Untold Story of Hollywood's Creative Artists Agency, centered on the rise of Creative Artists Agency (CAA). In 2017 Miller launched a new podcast with DGital Media called 'Origins' that explores the development of media property. Subjects have included Sex and the City and Curb Your Enthusiasm. Miller announced in 2019 that his next project will be an oral history of media giant HBO.

== Bibliography ==
- Miller, James Andrew (2017). Powerhouse: The Untold Story of Hollywood's Creative Artists Agency (Custom House). ISBN 978-0062441386
- Miller, James Andrew (2015). Live From New York: The Complete, Uncensored History of Saturday Night Live as Told by Its Stars, Writers, and Guests (Back Bay Books). ISBN 978-0316295062
- Miller, James Andrew (2011). Those Guys Have All the Fun: Inside the World of ESPN (Back Bay Books). ISBN 978-0316043014
- Miller, James A. (1986). Running in place: Inside the Senate (Simon and Schuster). ISBN 978-0671499280
