= Bruce Cohen =

American film producer

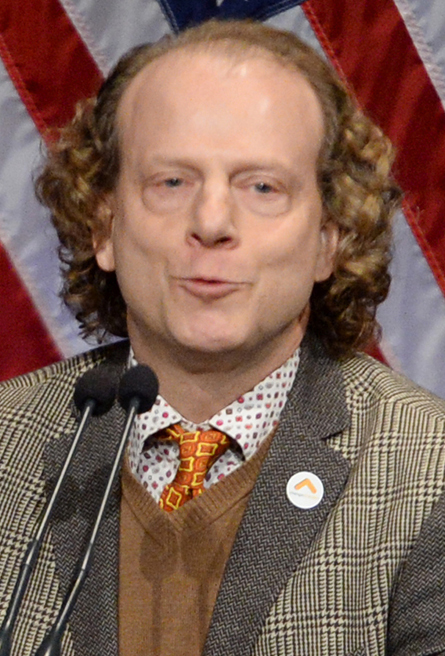
- Cohen in 2015
- Born: September 23, 1961 (age 65); Falls Church, Virginia, US
- Occupation: Producer
- Years active: 1985–present
- Notable work: American Beauty; Milk; Silver Linings Playbook
- Spouse: Gabriel Catone (m. 2008)
- Children: 1
- Awards: Academy Award for Best Picture; American Beauty (1999)

Bruce L. Cohen (born September 23, 1961) is a film, television, and theater producer. He is best known for producing the films American Beauty, Milk, and Silver Linings Playbook. American Beauty won the Academy Award for Best Picture at the 72nd Academy Awards ceremony.

== Early life and education ==
Cohen was born to a Jewish family and raised in Falls Church, Virginia. In 1983, he graduated from Yale University with a Bachelor of Arts in Film Studies.

== Career ==
After school, Cohen moved to Los Angeles, where he accepted a clerical job as a Directors Guild of America trainee on Steven Spielberg's The Color Purple, and went on to serve as associate producer and first assistant director on Spielberg's Hook. In 2000, Cohen won the Academy Award for Best Picture for producing American Beauty. The film, directed by Sam Mendes, won a total of five Oscars, as well as the Golden Globe, British Academy of Film and Television (BAFTA), and Producers Guild of America (PGA) awards.

He later earned additional Best Picture nominations for Milk and Silver Linings Playbook. Milk, directed by Gus Van Sant, was nominated for eight Academy Awards and won Oscars for Best Actor and Best Original Screenplay, as well as the PGA's Stanley Kramer Award. Silver Linings Playbook, written and directed by David O. Russell, was nominated for eight Oscars. It was the first film in 31 years to be nominated in all four acting categories, with Jennifer Lawrence going on to win the Oscar for Best Actress.

Other films Cohen has produced include Big Fish, directed by Tim Burton, which was nominated for both Golden Globe and BAFTA Best Picture awards. In 2013, he served as lead producer of the stage musical version of Big Fish on Broadway, under the direction and choreography of five-time Tony winner Susan Stroman.

On television, Cohen was executive producer of the ABC series Pushing Daisies, which won a total of seven Emmys and was nominated for a Golden Globe as Best Comedy. He was also executive producer of the CBS special Movies Rock. In 2011, he was nominated for an Emmy in 2011 for producing the 83rd Annual Academy Awards.

Cohen is on the Board of Governors of the Producer's Guild, having served two terms as vice president of motion pictures, and is on the Executive Committee of the Producers Branch of the Academy of Motion Picture Arts and Sciences. He is president of the board of directors of the American Foundation for Equal Rights, the group behind the recently successful Supreme Court case to have California's Proposition 8 declared unconstitutional.

In 2019, Bruce Cohen joined the Advisory Board for the Harlem Film House, which presents the Hip Hop Film Festival, an annual event that focuses on filmmakers from the global culture of hip hop and also promotes financial sustainability for independent filmmakers from marginalized or economically disadvantaged communities.

== Personal life ==
He is married to Gabriel Catone and they have a daughter.

== Filmography ==
Cohen was a producer on all films unless otherwise noted:

=== Film ===
Year	Film	Credit
1991	Hook	Associate producer
1993	Alive	Co-producer
1994	The Flintstones	
1995	To Wong Foo, Thanks for Everything! Julie Newmar	Executive producer
1997	Mouse Hunt	
1999	American Beauty	
2000	The Flintstones in Viva Rock Vegas	
2003	Down with Love	
2003	Big Fish	
2004	The Forgotten	
2007	The Nines	
2008	Milk	
2012	Silver Linings Playbook	
2016	Bleed for This	
2017	Rebel in the Rye	
2023	Ex-Husbands	
2023	Rustin	
2023	We Are Guardians	Executive producer
2024	Blink Twice	
TBA	Richard Pryor: Is It Something I Said?	
TBA	Stardusk	Executive producer

Second unit director or assistant director

Year	Film	Role
1985	The Color Purple	DGA trainee
1987	Cherry 2000	DGA trainee
1987	Batteries Not Included	Second assistant director
1988	The Couch Trip	Second assistant director
1988	Satisfaction	Second assistant director
1988	Cocoon: The Return	Second assistant director
1988	The Boost	Second assistant director
1989	Always	Second assistant director
1990	Arachnophobia	First assistant director
1991	Hook	First assistant director
2000	The Flintstones in Viva Rock Vegas	Second unit director

As an actor

Year	Film	Role	Notes
1999	American Beauty	Bartender	Uncredited

Script and continuity department

Year	Film	Role	Notes
1994	The Flintstones	Script revision	Uncredited

Thanks

Year	Film	Role
2000	Mothman	The producers wish to thank
2022	To Leslie	Special thanks

=== Television ===
Year	Title	Credit	Notes
1996	Centennial Olympic Games: Torch Relay Opening Ceremonies		Television special
1996	Mistrial		Television film
2005	Hate	Executive producer	Television film
2007	Traveler	Executive producer	
2007	Side Order of Life	Executive producer	
2007	Movies Rock	Executive producer	Television special
2007−09	Pushing Daisies	Executive producer	
2011	83rd Academy Awards		Television special
2012	8	Executive producer	Television film
2017	When We Rise	Executive producer	

Miscellaneous crew

Year	Title	Role
1990	As the World Turns	Technical director
