= List of United States tornadoes from January to March 2017 =

From January to March 2017, various weather forecast offices of the National Weather Service confirmed at least 399 tornadoes across the United States, activity well beyond climatological norms. Based on the 1991–2010 average, the first month of the year is expected to see 35 tornadoes, with 29 occurring in February and 80 forming throughout March. In 2017, however, the count for the first three months was 135, 70, and 194, respectively. Activity began with the development of an EF1 tornado north of Jasper, Texas at 15:03 UTC on January 2. The latest storm of the period was an EF1 that touched down southeast of Powellsville, North Carolina at 22:15 UTC on March 31. The strongest tornado, an EF4, carved a path of destruction from Perryville, Missouri to southwest of Christopher, Illinois. Meanwhile, the deadliest tornado of the period was of EF3 intensity that destroyed a mobile home park south of Adel, Georgia, killing 11 people.

The first month of the year featured the second-highest tornado count on record, surpassed only by 1999. A total of 135 tornadoes were confirmed, resultant from two major outbreaks that affected the United States on January 2 and from January 21–23. The latter event was the second-largest January outbreak on record (with 81 confirmed tornadoes), second to January 21–23, 1999, and the third-largest wintertime outbreak, excelled only by the aforementioned incident and the 2008 Super Tuesday tornado outbreak. In addition, the outbreak led to 42 tornadoes in the state of Georgia, upending the previous record of 25 set during 2004's Hurricane Ivan. Twenty people were killed from January 21–23, the second-highest count during a January event to the 1969 Hazlehurst, Mississippi tornado outbreak. February, meanwhile, featured 70 tornadoes, a count well below that of the preceding month's but still over twice the long-term average. An outbreak on the final day of February into the first day of March produced 72 tornadoes and 4 fatalities. On the back of that outbreak, an event of 63 tornadoes across similar areas a week later, and continued activity in the weeks following, March observed a total of 194 tornadoes.

== United States yearly total ==
Confirmed tornadoes by Enhanced Fujita rating
EFU	EF0	EF1	EF2	EF3	EF4	EF5	Total
67	618	592*	128	13	2	0	1,420

- Note: An EF2 tornado from Canada crossed into the United States, where that portion of the track was rated EF1.

== January ==
Confirmed tornadoes by Enhanced Fujita rating
EFU	EF0	EF1	EF2	EF3	EF4	EF5	Total
0	38	75	19	3	0	0	135

=== January 2 event ===
List of confirmed tornadoes – Monday, January 2, 2017 (Note: All dates are based on the local time zone where the tornado touched down; however, all times are in Coordinated Universal Time for consistency.)
EF#	Location	County / Parish	State	Start Coord.	Time (UTC)	Path length	Max width
EF1	N of Jasper	Jasper	TX	31.0707°N 94.0210°W	15:03–15:04	2.55 mi (4.10 km)	100 yd (91 m)
EF1	Multiple trees were downed on a golf course and surrounding properties. Total economic losses reached $30,000.						
EF1	ESE of Call	Newton	TX	30.5821°N 93.7580°W	15:44–15:45	2.57 mi (4.14 km)	100 yd (91 m)
EF1	Multiple pine trees were snapped, blocking roadways. Total economic losses reached $30,000.						
EF1	NE of Fields	Beauregard	LA	30.5732°N 93.5343°W	16:06–16:07	0.3 mi (0.48 km)	20 yd (18 m)
EF1	A portion of a metal roof was pulled off a church. Several trees were snapped. Total economic losses reached $25,000.						
EF1	N of Oretta	Beauregard	LA	30.5618°N 93.4362°W	16:17–16:18	1.2 mi (1.9 km)	50 yd (46 m)
EF1	Several trees were snapped or downed; fallen trees damaged homes. A barn or garage had part of its metal roof ripped off. Total economic losses reached $50,000.						
EF1	SSW of Longville	Beauregard	LA	30.5567°N 93.3157°W	16:30–16:32	4.64 mi (7.47 km)	100 yd (91 m)
EF1	Pine trees were snapped, and a barn had a portion of its metal roof ripped off. Total economic losses reached $20,000.						
EF1	S of Ragley	Beauregard	LA	30.4543°N 93.2502°W	16:30–16:34	2.74 mi (4.41 km)	100 yd (91 m)
EF1	Several garages and outbuildings were damaged or destroyed, utility poles and trees were downed, and 10–25 homes sustained damage mainly to their roofs. Total economic losses reached $150,000.						
EF1	ESE of Boyce	Rapides	LA	31.3704°N 92.5896°W	17:06–17:07	0.54 mi (0.87 km)	50 yd (46 m)
EF1	A single-wide mobile home had part of its roof removed, a carport was tipped over, and several trees were snapped. Two additional houses sustained damage from flying debris. Total economic losses reached $50,000.						
EF0	WSW of Mamou	Evangeline	LA	30.6231°N 92.4694°W	17:30–17:31	0.54 mi (0.87 km)	25 yd (23 m)
EF0	Three homes had metal roofing partially removed. Total economic losses reached $75,000.						
EF1	WNW of Cheneyville	Rapides	LA	31.0325°N 92.3705°W	17:31–17:33	1.4 mi (2.3 km)	100 yd (91 m)
EF1	Several homes and large barns were damaged, with debris tossed into adjacent fields. Total economic losses reached $250,000.						
EF1	Bunkie	Avoyelles	LA	30.9446°N 92.1952°W	17:44–17:45	1.64 mi (2.64 km)	200 yd (180 m)
EF1	Widespread tree damage was observed in town; two homes were destroyed by fallen trees. Approximately 70 additional buildings were damaged or destroyed. Total economic losses reached $1,000,000.						
EF1	Hessmer	Avoyelles	LA	31.0602°N 92.1408°W	17:47–17:49	2.84 mi (4.57 km)	200 yd (180 m)
EF1	Numerous trees were snapped or uprooted, numerous power lines and power poles were downed, a moving truck was tipped on its side, and at least 30 buildings were damaged or destroyed in or around Hessmer. Total economic losses reached $1,000,000.						
EF1	SSE of Marksville	Avoyelles	LA	31.0967°N 92.0663°W	17:51–17:52	1.05 mi (1.69 km)	200 yd (180 m)
EF1	One hangar and two planes were damaged at an airport. A Wal-Mart had some of its skylights and part of its roof damaged. Neighboring strip smalls sustained facade damage, a portable fireworks shop was destroyed, and several large trees fell on buildings and homes. Total economic losses reached $2,500,000.						
EF0	ESE of Fayette	Jefferson	MS	31.6671°N 90.9352°W	19:02–19:05	3.89 mi (6.26 km)	250 yd (230 m)
EF0	A few dozen trees were snapped or uprooted; limbs were broken. Total economic losses reached $50,000.						
EF1	Peyton	Claiborne	MS	31.8337°N 90.8228°W	19:14–19:20	5.59 mi (9.00 km)	200 yd (180 m)
EF1	Many trees were snapped or uprooted, power lines were downed, and a few sheds sustained damage. Total economic losses reached $40,000.						
EF1	W of Wesson	Lincoln, Copiah	MS	31.6904°N 90.5888°W	19:21–19:28	6.81 mi (10.96 km)	300 yd (270 m)
EF1	A church was pushed off its foundation, causing moderate wall damage. Several sheds were damaged, several houses sustained roof damage, and heavy tree damage was observed. A mobile home had its roof blown off. Total economic losses reached $425,000.						
EF1	ENE of Kentwood	Tangipahoa	LA	30.9533°N 90.4358°W	19:45–19:46	0.08 mi (0.13 km)	75 yd (69 m)
EF1	Several large pine trees were snapped or uprooted.						
EF1	ESE of Magnolia	Pike	MS	31.0883°N 90.3515°W	19:55–20:00	3.96 mi (6.37 km)	100 yd (91 m)
EF1	Large trees were snapped or uprooted; several houses and mobile homes were damaged by fallen trees.						
EF1	W of Tylertown	Walthall	MS	31.1158°N 90.2267°W	20:00–20:02	0.85 mi (1.37 km)	100 yd (91 m)
EF1	Some large trees were snapped or uprooted; power lines were damaged by fallen trees.						
EF1	WNW of Pinola to ESE of Mendenhall	Simpson	MS	31.8836°N 89.9774°W	20:02–20:12	9.43 mi (15.18 km)	400 yd (370 m)
EF1	Many trees were snapped or uprooted. Several houses sustained roof damage or damage as a result of fallen trees. Four large sheds were heavily damaged, four houses on a chicken farm sustained moderate roof damage, and two additional structures sustained roof damage. Total economic losses reached $200,000.						
EF2	E of Mount Olive	Covington	MS	31.7314°N 89.6559°W	20:21–20:26	4.2 mi (6.8 km)	300 yd (270 m)
EF2	A few large chicken houses were heavily damaged or destroyed; a few additional structures sustained lesser damage. Trees were damaged. Total economic losses reached $100,000.						
EF1	Stringer	Smith, Jasper	MS	31.8590°N 89.3335°W	20:43–20:47	3.85 mi (6.20 km)	275 yd (251 m)
EF1	Many large trees were snapped or downed in and to the west of Stringer. Some homes sustained minor roof damage as well. Total economic losses reached $110,000.						
EF0	S of Bush	St. Tammany	LA	30.5895°N 89.9019°W	20:44	0.01 mi (0.016 km)	5 yd (4.6 m)
EF0	Several small trees were snapped or toppled.						
EF1	SE of Purvis	Lamar, Forrest	MS	31.119°N 89.4591°W	20:52–20:59	8.36 mi (13.45 km)	225 yd (206 m)
EF1	Trees sustained minor to moderate damage, and a few structures sustained modest damage. Total economic losses reached $30,000.						
EF0	N of Enterprise	Lauderdale	MS	32.26°N 88.81°W	21:28–21:29	1.5 mi (2.4 km)	75 yd (69 m)
EF0	A handful of trees were snapped or had limbs broken off. Total economic losses reached $20,000.						
EF1	WNW of Inverness	Bullock	AL	32.0308°N 85.8742°W	22:24–22:32	3.4 mi (5.5 km)	485 yd (443 m)
EF1	Numerous trees were snapped or uprooted, and a camper was overturned.						
EF1	WSW of Weston	Stewart	GA	31.9536°N 84.6755°W	22:58–23:00	0.59 mi (0.95 km)	200 yd (180 m)
EF1	Brief tornado destroyed more than half of two chicken houses, toppled an irrigation sprinkler, and snapped and uprooted several large trees. Total economic losses reached $60,000.						
EF2	Rehobeth	Geneva, Houston	AL	31.1104°N 85.5078°W	01:35–01:44	7.82 mi (12.59 km)	500 yd (460 m)
EF2	This tornado caused considerable damage in and near Rehobeth. Several large trees were snapped, uprooted, and/or debarked. The roof of a home under construction was ripped off, and other homes sustained minor damage. At a festival grounds, multiple buildings were damaged or destroyed, and utility poles were snapped. Rear flank downdraft winds from the parent supercell blew a large tree over onto a mobile home, killing four people. Total economic losses reached $550,000.						
EF1	SE of Dothan	Houston	AL	31.1818°N 85.37°W	01:46–01:51	2.52 mi (4.06 km)	200 yd (180 m)
EF1	One home had its roof ripped off while others sustained significant shingle damage. Total economic losses reached $100,000.						
EF2	SSW of Blakely	Early	GA	31.2767°N 85.0086°W	02:12–02:19	4.34 mi (6.98 km)	400 yd (370 m)
EF2	Two residences were significantly damaged, with a portion of the roof deck removed. Several farm buildings were destroyed. Total economic losses reached $500,000.						
EF1	SW of Donalsonville	Seminole	GA	30.9973°N 84.945°W	02:14–02:18	3.73 mi (6.00 km)	600 yd (550 m)
EF1	Two mobile homes, a house, and pecan groves were all damaged. Total economic losses reached $300,000.						
EF2	S of Blakely to NNW of Damascus	Early	GA	31.2567°N 84.9037°W	02:18–02:33	10.87 mi (17.49 km)	1,000 yd (910 m)
EF2	A few farm buildings and silos were destroyed. A pivot irrigation system was overturned, a mobile home sustained roof damage, and numerous trees were snapped or uprooted, including a few that were debarked. Total economic losses reached $500,000.						
EF2	SE of Arlington	Early	GA	31.369°N 84.7196°W	02:34–02:41	4.43 mi (7.13 km)	500 yd (460 m)
EF2	Significant tree damage and some structural damage was observed. A barn was destroyed. Total economic losses reached $100,000.						
EF1	NE of Colquitt	Miller, Baker	GA	31.1844°N 84.5714°W	02:41–02:53	9.91 mi (15.95 km)	1,000 yd (910 m)
EF1	Trees, homes, and outbuildings were damaged. Total economic losses reached $50,000.						
EF0	NNW of Leary	Calhoun	GA	31.4846°N 84.5174°W	02:52–02:54	0.66 mi (1.06 km)	400 yd (370 m)
EF0	Numerous trees were snapped or uprooted, several house roofs and outbuildings were damaged, and numerous power lines and power poles were downed. Total economic losses reached $250,000.						
EF1	N of Baconton	Mitchell	GA	31.4107°N 84.164°W	03:08–03:16	3.97 mi (6.39 km)	200 yd (180 m)
EF1	Around 3,000 pecan trees were destroyed. Several mobile homes sustained roof damage. Total economic losses reached $7,600,000.						
EF1	NW of Sylvester	Dougherty, Worth	GA	31.6417°N 84.0093°W	03:32–03:42	8.95 mi (14.40 km)	600 yd (550 m)
EF1	A strongly convergent pattern was observed in trees. Total economic losses reached $500,000.						

=== January 7 event ===
List of confirmed tornadoes – Saturday, January 7, 2017
EF#	Location	County / Parish	State	Start Coord.	Time (UTC)	Path length	Max width
EF0	WSW of Live Oak	Suwannee	FL	30.2745°N 83.0506°W	06:30–06:32	0.24 mi (0.39 km)	50 yd (46 m)
EF0	Several properties sustained roof damage. Large trees were snapped, twisted, or downed.						

=== January 9 event ===
List of confirmed tornadoes – Monday, January 9, 2017
EF#	Location	County / Parish	State	Start Coord.	Time (UTC)	Path length	Max width
EF0	SW of Lincoln	Placer	CA	38.8491°N 121.3272°W	22:00–22:02	0.18 mi (0.29 km)	20 yd (18 m)
EF0	A tornado was photographed in a grassy field. No damage occurred.						

=== January 11 event ===
List of confirmed tornadoes – Wednesday, January 11, 2017
EF#	Location	County / Parish	State	Start Coord.	Time (UTC)	Path length	Max width
EF0	Southern Natomas	Sacramento	CA	38.6267°N 121.4805°W	08:01–08:04	0.42 mi (0.68 km)	130 yd (120 m)
EF0	Several trees were snapped or stripped of limbs, shingle damage occurred, two small awnings were twisted and downed, and several fences were damaged. Total economic losses reached $25,000.						

=== January 13 event ===
List of confirmed tornadoes – Friday, January 13, 2017
EF#	Location	County / Parish	State	Start Coord.	Time (UTC)	Path length	Max width
EF0	Walburg	Williamson	TX	30.722°N 97.582°W	15:33–15:36	1.19 mi (1.92 km)	25 yd (23 m)
EF0	Four homes sustained damage to their roofs, shingles, and associated vegetation. One business had a large section of its metal roof ripped off.						

=== January 15 event ===
List of confirmed tornadoes – Sunday, January 15, 2017
EF#	Location	County / Parish	State	Start Coord.	Time (UTC)	Path length	Max width	Summary
EF0	W of Madisonville	Madison	TX	30.9217°N 96.114°W	21:48–21:50	1.25 mi (2.01 km)	20 yd (18 m)	A tornado captured on video caused minor tree damage.
EF2	NE of Gatesville	Coryell, Bosque	TX	31.49°N 97.67°W	23:45–00:05	12.92 mi (20.79 km)	200 yd (180 m)	A few houses were damaged, including two that lost most of their roofs. Several barns, storage sheds, and pieces of farm machinery were damaged, and several power poles were broken. Total economic losses reached $500,000.
EF1	Clifton	Bosque	TX	31.77°N 97.58°W	00:17–00:20	1.38 mi (2.22 km)	120 yd (110 m)	Approximately 20–30 houses in Clifton sustained damage, and several trees were uprooted. Total economic losses reached $90,000.
EF1	W of Whitney	Bosque, Hill	TX	31.92°N 97.42°W	00:38–00:50	5.8 mi (9.3 km)	200 yd (180 m)	Numerous homes, a church, and a marina were damaged, mainly to roofs and shingles; ten of the houses were severely damaged. Two people were injured. Total economic losses reached $290,000.
EF2	SE of Brady	McCulloch	TX	31.0817°N 99.2111°W	01:00–01:05	1.99 mi (3.20 km)	450 yd (410 m)	Numerous large trees had their trunks snapped off or were uprooted. No property damage occurred.
EF0	SE of Mansfield	Johnson, Tarrant	TX	32.52°N 97.12°W	02:11–02:14	3.07 mi (4.94 km)	40 yd (37 m)	Metal buildings, one barn, and one house were damaged. Total economic losses reached $75,000.
EF0	Grand Prairie	Dallas	TX	32.69°N 97.034°W	02:43–02:45	0.31 mi (0.50 km)	80 yd (73 m)	Fences were downed, while businesses, homes, and a hangar sustained minor damage. Grand Prairie Municipal Airport recorded a peak gust of 63 mph (101 km/h). Total economic losses reached $120,000.

=== January 16 event ===
List of confirmed tornadoes – Monday, January 16, 2017
EF#	Location	County / Parish	State	Start Coord.	Time (UTC)	Path length	Max width	Summary
EF1	W of Mexia	Limestone	TX	31.69°N 96.55°W	08:43–08:48	3.13 mi (5.04 km)	250 yd (230 m)	At least six buildings were damaged, one of which was destroyed. Total economic losses reached $300,000.
EF0	N of Jersey Village	Harris	TX	29.9302°N 95.5648°W	13:31–13:32	0.1 mi (0.16 km)	20 yd (18 m)	Three houses sustained roof and window damage, with fencing downed and also lifted onto the roof of a house.
EF0	WNW of Spring	Harris	TX	30.0850°N 95.4498°W	14:35–14:36	0.1 mi (0.16 km)	20 yd (18 m)	Numerous small limbs and pine needles were downed.
EF0	NNW of Spring	Montgomery	TX	30.1276°N 95.4339°W	14:40–14:41	0.2 mi (0.32 km)	20 yd (18 m)	A store had its door window broken, loose debris was blown around, and a large tree was snapped.

=== January 18 event ===
List of confirmed tornadoes – Wednesday, January 18, 2017
EF#	Location	County / Parish	State	Start Coord.	Time (UTC)	Path length	Max width
EF1	E of Burkeville	Newton	TX	30.9883°N 93.6172°W	19:40–19:41	0.6 mi (0.97 km)	25 yd (23 m)
EF1	Several trees were snapped or uprooted. One house had its carport peeled back while another home had part of its tin roof ripped off. A deer feed and water device was tossed, decapitating a deer. Total economic losses reached $50,000.						

=== January 19 event ===
List of confirmed tornadoes – Thursday, January 19, 2017
EF#	Location	County / Parish	State	Start Coord.	Time (UTC)	Path length	Max width
EF2	E of Magee to N of Raleigh	Simpson, Smith	MS	31.8672°N 89.669°W	13:53–14:36	19.26 mi (31.00 km)	500 yd (460 m)
EF2	Numerous trees were snapped or uprooted, numerous power poles were snapped, and numerous power lines were downed. Multiple large barns and sheds were heavily damaged or destroyed. Numerous homes sustained varying degrees of damage. One small house was destroyed, sustaining loss of its roof and exterior walls. One person was injured. Total economic losses reached $2,300,000.						
EF1	SSW of Pell City	St. Clair	AL	33.4785°N 86.3045°W	23:58–00:00	0.7 mi (1.1 km)	175 yd (160 m)
EF1	Four boathouses were destroyed while another had its metal roof peeled back, and numerous trees were snapped or uprooted.						

=== January 21 event ===
List of confirmed tornadoes – Saturday, January 21, 2017
EF#	Location	County / Parish	State	Start Coord.	Time (UTC)	Path length	Max width	Summary
EF3	NW of Purvis to Hattiesburg/Petal to NE of Runnelstown	Lamar, Forrest, Perry	MS	31.1855°N 89.4799°W	0935–1013	31.06 mi (49.99 km)	900 yd (820 m)	4 deaths – See section on this tornado – 57 people were injured.
EF2	SE of Gilbertown to E of Putnam	Choctaw, Marengo	AL	31.8476°N 88.2905°W	1114–1137	20.43 mi (32.88 km)	800 yd (730 m)	Five homes were destroyed, including three mobile homes, and dozens of other structures sustained varying degree of damage. Four people were injured.
EF1	E of Wayne	Marengo	AL	32.0988°N 87.7823°W	1155–1201	4.20 mi (6.76 km)	900 yd (820 m)	Several trees were downed, and a few outbuildings were damaged.
EF1	Southern LaGrange	Troup	GA	32.9792°N 85.0487°W	1349–1402	5.42 mi (8.72 km)	200 yd (180 m)	A metal building had part of its roof ripped off and garage doors blown in. Homes and a church sustained minor roof damage, and a sign was blown over. A trampoline was thrown 30 yards, and trees were snapped and uprooted along the path as well. Total economic losses reached $50,000.
EF1	SE of Blue Ridge	Elmore	AL	32.4692°N 86.1733°W	1355–1356	0.68 mi (1.09 km)	200 yd (180 m)	A dozen trees were downed, one of which destroyed an outbuilding.
EF1	Wetumpka	Elmore	AL	32.5299°N 86.2179°W	1355–1358	1.54 mi (2.48 km)	450 yd (410 m)	Several structures in Wetumpka were damaged, including a church. Trees were snapped and uprooted as well.
EF0	S of Emerald Mountain	Elmore	AL	32.4359°N 86.1064°W	1357	0.21 mi (0.34 km)	90 yd (82 m)	Fencing, trees, and metal siding were damaged at Emerald Mountain Christian Academy.
EF1	W of Marvyn	Macon, Lee	AL	32.4740°N 85.4557°W	1448–1450	2.84 mi (4.57 km)	100 yd (91 m)	Two homes suffered roof damage and several trees were snapped.
EF0	S of Auburn	Lee	AL	32.5267°N 85.4825°W	1449–1453	2.38 mi (3.83 km)	150 yd (140 m)	Several trees were snapped or uprooted.
EF1	N of Goshen to Troy to E of Louisville	Pike, Barbour	AL	31.7870°N 86.1345°W	1455–1538	37.47 mi (60.30 km)	400 yd (370 m)	A mobile home was severely damaged, injuring two occupants. Minor roof and gutter damage was inflicted to other homes, outbuildings were damaged or destroyed, and groves of trees were snapped or uprooted by this long-track but weak tornado. Damage to trees occurred in Troy, one of which was uprooted and landed on a home, causing structural damage. Near the end of the path, homes sustained minor shingle damage in the northern part of Louisville.
EF0	N of Beauregard	Lee	AL	32.5626°N 85.3572°W	1456–1458	1.07 mi (1.72 km)	150 yd (140 m)	A weak tornado damaged shingles and snapped or uprooted several trees.
EF0	SSE of Opelika	Lee	AL	32.6138°N 85.3677°W	1500–1501	0.82 mi (1.32 km)	150 yd (140 m)	Several structures sustained damage to their shingles, and numerous pine trees were downed.
EF0	NW of Crawford	Lee	AL	32.4811°N 85.2189°W	1508	0.13 mi (0.21 km)	50 yd (46 m)	Several roofs and wooden fences were damaged.
EF1	Smiths Station	Lee	AL	32.5294°N 85.1094°W	1519–1520	0.95 mi (1.53 km)	300 yd (270 m)	Dozens of trees were downed. Several buildings at the Smiths Station School Athletic Complex were destroyed and others were damaged.
EF1	WSW of Cataula to W of Waverly Hall	Harris	GA	32.6812°N 84.9462°W	1533–1551	10.84 mi (17.45 km)	400 yd (370 m)	Several homes sustained substantial roof damage, an outdoor shelter was destroyed, and numerous large trees were snapped or uprooted. Intense pressure falls near the tornado caused four to six biscuit cans at a super market to pop open. Total economic losses reached $75,000.
EF0	SW of Woodland	Talbot	GA	32.7684°N 84.6379°W	1606–1610	1.92 mi (3.09 km)	100 yd (91 m)	Numerous trees were snapped in a wilderness area. Total economic losses reached $10,000.
EF1	NE of Woodland to SSE of Sunset Village	Talbot, Upson	GA	32.8097°N 84.5331°W	1614–1628	9.52 mi (15.32 km)	300 yd (270 m)	Numerous trees were snapped or uprooted, a small shed was destroyed, and a small building was overturned. Total economic losses reached $65,000.
EF1	E of Junction City to SSW of Salem	Taylor	GA	32.5937°N 84.3997°W	1618–1633	12.25 mi (19.71 km)	400 yd (370 m)	Two metal barns were destroyed, a small silo was ripped out of the ground and thrown over 300 yd (270 m), and numerous trees were snapped or uprooted. A single-story home and a trailer sustained significant roof, window, and siding damage. Total economic losses reached $100,000.
EF2	ESE of Sprewell Bluff State Park to N of Sunset Village	Talbot, Upson	GA	32.8318°N 84.4239°W	1622–1629	5.68 mi (9.14 km)	300 yd (270 m)	Hundreds of trees were snapped or uprooted. One home was severely damaged while several others sustained less severe roof damage. Total economic losses reached $300,000.
EF1	S of Sunset Village to Western Thomaston	Upson	GA	32.8477°N 84.4077°W	1625–1634	5.26 mi (8.47 km)	200 yd (180 m)	One home sustained significant roof damage, a second sustained moderate roof damage, and a third had its porch ripped off. Numerous trees and power lines were downed as the tornado entered the western part of Thomaston before dissipating. Total economic losses reached $75,000.
EF0	SW of Hannahs Mill	Upson	GA	32.9182°N 84.36°W	1632–1634	0.78 mi (1.26 km)	100 yd (91 m)	Numerous trees were downed or snapped, causing a car accident. Total economic losses reached $20,000.
EF1	NE of Hannahs Mill	Upson	GA	32.9499°N 84.3131°W	1639–1641	1.87 mi (3.01 km)	175 yd (160 m)	A home had a portion of its roof ripped off, numerous trees were snapped or uprooted, and an outbuilding lost wood or metal roof panels. Total economic losses reached $20,000.
EF1	S of Marshallville	Macon	GA	32.4111°N 84.009°W	1659–1707	8.92 mi (14.36 km)	100 yd (91 m)	Three irrigation systems were overturned, structures sustained minor roof damage, and trees were damaged. Total economic losses reached $30,000.
EF0	SE of Forsyth	Monroe	GA	32.9113°N 83.8972°W	1708–1720	8.84 mi (14.23 km)	250 yd (230 m)	Several dozen trees were snapped or uprooted, and a residence sustained minor roof damage. Total economic losses reached $15,000.
EF2	SE of Fort Valley to Warner Robins	Peach, Houston	GA	32.5114°N 83.7901°W	1711–1729	12.85 mi (20.68 km)	250 yd (230 m)	A rain-wrapped tornado damaged dozens of homes, snapped or uprooted countless trees, and downed brick fences in Warner Robins. One home had much its roof torn off, while others were damaged to a lesser degree. Projectiles were driven through exterior walls and into the ground. A sports complex and a business were damaged, and 15 to 20 mobile homes were severely damaged in a mobile home park. Two large HVAC units were tossed 50 yd (46 m) from the top of a Walmart, where the auto bay doors on the back of the store were blown in, the roof was lifted, and rafters were twisted. Total economic losses reached $295,000.
EF0	WSW of Danville	Twiggs	GA	32.535°N 83.385°W	1746–1752	4.23 mi (6.81 km)	100 yd (91 m)	Approximately 100 trees were downed, and one section of an irrigation system was overturned. Total economic losses reached $50,000.
EF1	NE of Cochran	Bleckley	GA	32.444°N 83.313°W	1750–1755	4.32 mi (6.95 km)	100 yd (91 m)	A fence and numerous trees were downed. The roof was lifted off a small barn, three homes sustained roof damage, and an abandoned fire station was damaged. Total economic losses reached $30,000.
EF1	E of Irwinton	Wilkinson	GA	32.797°N 83.170°W	1754–1811	5.84 mi (9.40 km)	100 yd (91 m)	Multiple trees were snapped or uprooted. Total economic losses reached $10,000.
EF0	Lake Sinclair	Putnam	GA	33.1792°N 83.3430°W	1810–1812	0.57 mi (0.92 km)	50 yd (46 m)	Several softwood trees were snapped or uprooted, damaging some homes. Total economic losses reached $25,000.
EF0	N of Dublin	Laurens	GA	32.671°N 82.915°W	1820–1826	2.18 mi (3.51 km)	85 yd (78 m)	A couple dozen trees were uprooted. Total economic losses reached $12,000.
EF1	W of Deepstep	Hancock, Baldwin	GA	33.0525°N 83.0967°W	1828–1830	0.53 mi (0.85 km)	70 yd (64 m)	Numerous trees were snapped or uprooted. One residence had a portion of its tin roof peeled off while a second sustained damage to its awning and siding. Total economic losses reached $10,000.
EF0	SE of Wrightsville	Johnson	GA	32.688°N 82.641°W	1839–1848	6.39 mi (10.28 km)	100 yd (91 m)	A small outbuilding had its metal roof panels ripped off, a metal building sustained major roof damage, and multiple trees were snapped or uprooted. Total economic losses reached $10,000.
EF1	S of Tennille	Washington	GA	32.896°N 82.820°W	1840–1846	2.59 mi (4.17 km)	300 yd (270 m)	One mobile home was destroyed while another was severely damaged. Trees were damaged. Total economic losses reached $30,000.
EF1	ESE of Tennille	Washington	GA	32.924°N 82.779°W	1845–1849	1.3 mi (2.1 km)	300 yd (270 m)	Shingles were torn from roofs, a shed was destroyed, and a mobile home was rolled and destroyed. Total economic losses reached $50,000.
EF1	E of Tennille	Washington	GA	32.950°N 82.730°W	1846–1859	8.38 mi (13.49 km)	300 yd (270 m)	Numerous trees were downed, including dozens of pecan trees which were uprooted in an orchard. Total economic losses reached $60,000.
EF0	NW of Midville	Burke	GA	32.8601°N 82.2922°W	1909–1912	1.3 mi (2.1 km)	250 yd (230 m)	An irrigation system was turned over and several trees were downed.
EF0	SW of Canoochee	Emanuel	GA	32.6596°N 82.1848°W	1911–1915	4.8 mi (7.7 km)	200 yd (180 m)	A residence had its porch blown off, an outbuilding was destroyed, an outbuilding had its metal roofing panels ripped off, and numerous trees were snapped or uprooted. Total economic losses reached $50,000.
EF0	SSE of Vidette	Burke	GA	32.9581°N 82.1649°W	1923–1925	1.5 mi (2.4 km)	100 yd (91 m)	The roof of a metal barn and several calf weaning huts were damaged.
EF1	ESE of Waynesboro	Burke	GA	33.0648°N 81.9642°W	1940–1945	1 mi (1.6 km)	75 yd (69 m)	The exterior wall of a metal building was shredded, and numerous trees were snapped or uprooted.
EF0	SW of Hiltonia	Screven	GA	32.82°N 81.76°W	1942–1945	0.69 mi (1.11 km)	50 yd (46 m)	A carport attached to a residence was damaged, metal roofing was ripped from four storage buildings, and significant tree damage was observed.
EF0	W of Glennville	Tattnall	GA	31.93°N 82.09°W	1950–1952	0.91 mi (1.46 km)	250 yd (230 m)	Five chicken coops were heavily damaged, with metal roofing scattered 500 yd (460 m) downwind. A home sustained minor shingle damage, and several trees were downed or uprooted.
EF1	NE of Sylvania	Screven	GA	32.78°N 81.61°W	1952–1957	2.7 mi (4.3 km)	525 yd (480 m)	A motor vehicle was rolled downhill, the northeast wall of a metal firehouse was ripped off, and metal roofing was torn from several houses and outbuildings. A stop sign was tossed 50 yd (46 m), numerous trees were snapped or uprooted, and six headstones weighing up 200–400 lb (91–181 kg) were toppled.
EF2	N of Barnwell to NNW of Denmark	Barnwell, Bamberg	SC	33.2942°N 81.4055°W	2040–2102	15.9 mi (25.6 km)	1,600 yd (1,500 m)	Hundreds of softwood and hardwood trees were snapped or uprooted by this large wedge tornado, with numerous trees landing on homes and causing structural damage. Several structures were heavily damaged or destroyed, most notably a mobile home which was rolled several times and had its floors separated from the undercarriage. The inside occupant was injured. Several chicken houses suffered extensive roof damage.
EF1	NW of Cope	Orangeburg	SC	33.3761°N 81.0839°W	2109–2119	5.47 mi (8.80 km)	400 yd (370 m)	Numerous trees were snapped or uprooted, three mobile homes were heavily damaged, and a metal farm building collapsed.
EF2	N of Scottsville	Harrison	TX	32.5199°N 94.2529°W	2218–2235	6.93 mi (11.15 km)	230 yd (210 m)	Numerous trees were snapped or uprooted, and numerous power lines were downed. One home had its roof ripped off while several others were damaged to a lesser extent, many by falling trees. Mobile homes were also damaged, outbuildings were destroyed, and a vehicle was overturned as well. Total economic losses reached $1,000,000.
EF1	WNW of Jefferson	Marion	TX	32.7724°N 94.4179°W	2219–2223	0.81 mi (1.30 km)	100 yd (91 m)	Numerous trees were snapped or uprooted, and numerous power lines were downed. A single-wide mobile home had its roof ripped off, and a tree landed on an outbuilding. Total economic losses reached $250,000.
EF2	NNW of Uncertain, TX to SW of Rodessa, LA	Marion (TX), Cass (TX), Caddo (LA)	TX, LA	32.8087°N 94.1962°W	2250–2328	13.36 mi (21.50 km)	800 yd (730 m)	A strong wedge tornado passed near the town of Vivian, snapping and uprooting numerous trees and downing many power lines. Several vehicles were pushed, a party barge boat was moved 200 yd (180 m) into a grove of trees, and a travel trailer was flipped. A house lost its entire roof and a back exterior wall, and a mobile home was shifted off its foundation. A woman was taking shelter in a bathtub inside the house that had its roof and back wall torn off. The tornado carried her through the air while she was in the tub and then deposited her in a wooded area, where she remained in the bathtub unharmed. Total economic losses reached $900,000.
EF2	ESE of Plain Dealing to W of Cullen	Bossier, Webster	LA	32.8883°N 93.6432°W	2312–2337	10.79 mi (17.36 km)	990 yd (910 m)	Numerous trees were snapped or uprooted, and numerous power lines were downed by this large wedge tornado. Two mobile homes were rolled and completely destroyed, several outbuildings were destroyed, and several houses sustained damage to their roofs and walls. In Webster Parish, a building in an ATV park had part of its roof removed. One person was knocked unconscious by a flying piece of lumber. Total economic losses reached $825,000.
EF1	S of Shongaloo	Webster	LA	32.8875°N 93.3193°W	2355–0007	3.5 mi (5.6 km)	350 yd (320 m)	Numerous trees were snapped or uprooted; a tree fell on a carport and a portion of a mobile home. Total economic losses reached $10,000.
EF2	NE of Natchez	Natchitoches	LA	31.6824°N 93.0381°W	2356–0003	2.04 mi (3.28 km)	300 yd (270 m)	Numerous power lines were downed, and numerous trees were snapped or uprooted. Five homes sustained significant damage, including one that had its roof ripped off and three exterior walls collapsed. Several outbuildings were severely damaged. One person suffered an arm injury. Total economic losses reached $500,000.
EF1	ESE of Aloha	Grant	LA	31.5566°N 92.7473°W	0100–0113	2.23 mi (3.59 km)	150 yd (140 m)	Numerous power lines were downed, and numerous trees were snapped or uprooted; fallen trees severely damaged one home and impacted a cemetery. A single-wide mobile home was flipped and rolled about 25 yards (23 m), injuring a woman inside. Several barns or outbuildings were damaged, a 3,000 lb (1,400 kg) trailer was flipped, killing a cow, and a large television antenna was toppled onto a home.
EF1	WSW of El Dorado	Union	AR	33.1731°N 92.807°W	0104–0109	2.89 mi (4.65 km)	75 yd (69 m)	Several pine trees were snapped or uprooted, one of which fell onto a home, damaging a small antenna tower.
EF0	Lawson	Union	AR	33.1908°N 92.4782°W	0138–0140	0.61 mi (0.98 km)	50 yd (46 m)	A single-wide mobile home had a portion of its roof peeled back and a portion of one wall detached. A few small trees were snapped.
EF1	S of Georgetown	Grant	LA	31.6287°N 92.4199°W	0151–0154	1.24 mi (2.00 km)	150 yd (140 m)	Numerous trees were snapped or uprooted, one of which caused severe damage to a home. Shingles were removed from several structures.
EF1	Jena	LaSalle	LA	31.6792°N 92.1562°W	0229–0230	0.16 mi (0.26 km)	100 yd (91 m)	Numerous trees were snapped or uprooted in town, one of which fell on a church. A wooden barn was damaged, a gas station canopy was blown 50 yd (46 m), and a local business' brick facade collapsed. Storage buildings were heavily damaged as well.
EF0	NW of Hamburg	Ashley	AR	33.2393°N 91.82°W	0245–0246	0.67 mi (1.08 km)	50 yd (46 m)	Picture evidence of a brief tornado was relayed.
EF0	SE of Marion	Union	LA	32.8663°N 92.1666°W	0248–0249	0.62 mi (1.00 km)	50 yd (46 m)	A metal shed sustained considerable damage, an outbuilding had its metal roof ripped off, and a few small trees were snapped.
EF1	NNE of Mer Rouge	Morehouse	LA	32.8212°N 91.7873°W	0304–0323	8.87 mi (14.27 km)	300 yd (270 m)	Mt. Olive Missionary Baptist Church and a few houses sustained roof damage. A television antenna was bent, numerous trees were snapped or uprooted, and power poles were toppled. A shed building roof collapsed, tin was blown around, and a large metal and PVC tank were blown over.
EF2	E of Meridian Station	Lauderdale	MS	32.4914°N 88.602°W	0444–0454	7.28 mi (11.72 km)	550 yd (500 m)	Numerous trees were snapped or uprooted, many of which caused structural damage upon falling. A church sustained minor roof damage. Many mobile homes were thrown or rolled, destroying four and injuring an occupant in the process. The undercarriage of one mobile home was found wrapped around a tree.

=== January 22 event ===
List of confirmed tornadoes – Sunday, January 22, 2017
EF#	Location	County / Parish	State	Start Coord.	Time (UTC)	Path length	Max width	Summary
EF0	S of Coaling	Tuscaloosa	AL	33.0439°N 87.3412°W	0636–0637	0.03 mi (0.048 km)	200 yd (180 m)	A brief tornado downed a few trees and damaged one home.
EF2	N of Thomasville to NE of Pavo	Thomas, Brooks	GA	30.8997°N 83.9821°W	0756–0818	18.67 mi (30.05 km)	700 yd (640 m)	A house lost a significant amount of roof deck, a mobile home was completely destroyed, and numerous pine trees were snapped or uprooted. A few other houses were damaged to a lesser degree. Three people were injured.
EF3	WSW of Barney to S of Adel to SE of Nashville	Brooks, Cook, Berrien	GA	30.9998°N 83.5841°W	0829–0858	24.66 mi (39.69 km)	700 yd (640 m)	11 deaths – See section on this tornado – 45 people were injured.
EF1	SW of Pembroke	Liberty	GA	32.01°N 81.67°W	0925–0927	0.59 mi (0.95 km)	250 yd (230 m)	At least 100 trees were damaged.
EF1	Baxley	Jeff Davis, Appling	GA	31.7404°N 82.5428°W	1052–1058	11.12 mi (17.90 km)	1,900 yd (1,700 m)	EF1 damage was inflicted to Zoar Methodist Church and surrounding areas as a result of this large wedge tornado.
EF1	NW of Valdosta	Lowndes	GA	30.8897°N 83.3891°W	1200–1204	4.84 mi (7.79 km)	400 yd (370 m)	Multiple homes had shingles ripped off, a large barn was destroyed, and numerous large pine trees were snapped or uprooted.
EF1	E of Headland	Henry	AL	31.3377°N 85.2515°W	1902–1914	5.52 mi (8.88 km)	100 yd (91 m)	A mobile home was destroyed, a few structures sustained minor roof damage, and numerous trees were snapped or uprooted.
EF1	NW of Inverness	Bullock	AL	32.1254°N 85.9570°W	1906–1911	2.20 mi (3.54 km)	330 yd (300 m)	At least one home and many trees suffered damage.
EF2	NNE of Bluffton to E of Coleman	Clay, Calhoun, Randolph	GA	31.5704°N 84.8654°W	1938–1952	12.03 mi (19.36 km)	400 yd (370 m)	A mobile home was flipped, injuring the occupant. Two homes had their entire roofing structures ripped off while several others sustained lesser damage. Numerous trees were snapped or uprooted.
EF0	Southwestern Auburn	Lee	AL	32.5302°N 85.5572°W	1946–1956	4.92 mi (7.92 km)	200 yd (180 m)	The roof of a mobile home was peeled back, apartment buildings sustained shingle damage, and small pine trees were snapped or uprooted.
EF1	NE of Apalachicola	Franklin	FL	29.8217°N 84.9188°W	1950–1954	2.36 mi (3.80 km)	350 yd (320 m)	Pine trees were snapped or uprooted.
EF1	Western Opelika	Lee	AL	32.6262°N 85.4207°W	2000–2007	3.09 mi (4.97 km)	540 yd (490 m)	Homes were damaged, including one small house that lost most of its roof. Numerous trees were snapped or uprooted, some of which landed on structures.
EF3	SE of Albany to W of Abbeville	Dougherty, Worth, Turner, Crisp, Wilcox	GA	31.4373°N 84.3447°W	2015–2127	70.69 mi (113.76 km)	2,200 yd (2,000 m)	5 deaths - 2017 Albany tornado
EF1	Cordele	Crisp	GA	31.916°N 83.808°W	2052–2102	6.93 mi (11.15 km)	300 yd (270 m)	Homes and mobile homes sustained roof damage in town, including 81 mobile homes at the Shady Lane mobile home park. Trees were downed as well.
EF1	N of Cochran	Bleckley	GA	32.4220°N 83.3588°W	2115–2119	2.24 mi (3.60 km)	100 yd (91 m)	Numerous trees were snapped or uprooted.
EF0	NW of Cary	Bleckley	GA	32.524°N 83.317°W	2122–2123	0.56 mi (0.90 km)	50 yd (46 m)	A few trees were uprooted.
EF1	NNE of Willacoochee	Atkinson, Coffee	GA	31.4020°N 83.0281°W	2147–2154	3.11 mi (5.01 km)	1,200 yd (1,100 m)	Four chicken houses were damaged, of which two were completely destroyed.
EF1	Woodbine	Camden	GA	30.9007°N 81.8579°W	2326–2347	16.64 mi (26.78 km)	120 yd (110 m)	Homes in a subdivision were heavily damaged at high-end EF1 strength. Significant tree damage was observed, with some trees landing on and damaging homes.
EF1	W of Woodbine	Camden	GA	30.9541°N 81.8902°W	2329–2331	1.65 mi (2.66 km)	120 yd (110 m)	A tornado debris signature was observed on Dual Pol radar products.

=== January 23 event ===
List of confirmed tornadoes – Monday, January 23, 2017
EF#	Location	County / Parish	State	Start Coord.	Time (UTC)	Path length	Max width	Summary
EF1	N of Loxahatchee	Palm Beach	FL	26.7896°N 80.3272°W	0625–0630	3.22 mi (5.18 km)	90 yd (82 m)	Trees and fences were damaged.
EF1	Palm Beach Gardens	Palm Beach	FL	26.8596°N 80.1432°W	0640–0649	5.79 mi (9.32 km)	130 yd (120 m)	This tornado caused damage in the Palm Beach Gardens neighborhood. Damage occurred to the private high school's football stadium and the public high school's building and baseball stadium. Minor damage also occurred at Juno Beach Pier and a nearby mobile home park. Total economic losses reached at least $500,000 to $1,000,000.
EF1	Miami Springs to Hialeah	Miami-Dade	FL	25.8162°N 80.3258°W	0845–0848	2.79 mi (4.49 km)	123 yd (112 m)	A weak tornado touched down just east of the Palmetto Expressway (SR 826) in Miami Springs and tracked east-northeast. Damage continued into Hialeah near a water plant before the tornado lifted.

== February ==
Confirmed tornadoes by Enhanced Fujita rating
EFU	EF0	EF1	EF2	EF3	EF4	EF5	Total
0	23	29	11	5	1	0	69

=== February 7 event ===
List of confirmed tornadoes – Tuesday, February 7, 2017
EF#	Location	County / Parish	State	Start Coord.	Time (UTC)	Path length	Max width	Summary
EF0	W of Slayden	Houston	TN	36.279024°N 87.574832°W	15:16–15:17	0.5 mi (0.80 km)	50 yd (46 m)	Numerous trees were downed, blocking roadways. Two homes sustained minor exterior damage, two sheds were destroyed, and a carport was collapsed. Several outbuildings sustained significant damage, and outdoor objects were tossed several hundred yards. Total economic damage reached $15,000.
EF2	S of Killian to W of Madisonville	Livingston, Tangipahoa, St. Tammany	LA	30.3128°N 90.5857°W	16:20–16:56	23.04 mi (37.08 km)	500 yd (460 m)	Large wedge tornado passed near Akers. One single family home had some siding removed while another had its chimney collapsed and some roofing material removed. A small and poorly constructed house was lifted off of its cinder block foundation and completely destroyed, seriously injuring two occupants. A single family home and a manufactured home sustained minor to moderate damage. Numerous trees were snapped or uprooted, and several sheds or barns were destroyed. The tornado was likely stronger than EF2; however, it primarily traversed marshland and no damage indicators above EF2 were found.
EF0	Metairie	Jefferson	LA	29.9611°N 90.1782°W	16:51–16:52	0.95 mi (1.53 km)	25 yd (23 m)	A brief tornado caused minor roof and tree damage in Metarie.
EF1	Donaldsonville to N of Union	Ascension, St. James	LA	30.0975°N 91.005°W	17:04–17:16	6.11 mi (9.83 km)	75 yd (69 m)	1 death – A tornado caused considerable damage in Donaldsonville. A total of 18 homes were affected, of which 14 sustained minor to moderate damage and 4 sustained heavy damage or were destroyed. One small home was shifted off its pier foundation, and several trees and power lines were downed. The fatality occurred when a trailer rolled over onto an elderly man, pinning him to a nearby vehicle.
EF3	New Orleans East to Lake Borgne	Orleans	LA	30.0105°N 90.000°W	17:12–17:32	10.09 mi (16.24 km)	600 yd (550 m)	See section on this tornado - 33 people were injured.
EF3	NW of Watson to SSW of Pine Grove	Livingston	LA	30.621°N 90.903°W	17:50–18:02	6.43 mi (10.35 km)	350 yd (320 m)	Numerous trees were snapped and uprooted, and several manufactured homes were completely destroyed. A metal truss tower supporting high tension electrical lines was twisted and collapsed. Frame homes sustained roof damage, and a metal industrial building had most of the exterior wall on one side of the building removed. Three people were injured.
EF1	SSE of Montpelier	Livingston	LA	30.6331°N 90.62°W	18:20–18:21	0.26 mi (0.42 km)	50 yd (46 m)	A carport lost some tin roof covering, several trees were snapped, and a telephone pole was leant.
EF0	E of Pike Road	Montgomery	AL	32.2737°N 86.0530°W	19:42–19:43	0.2 mi (0.32 km)	85 yd (78 m)	Several trees were snapped or uprooted, and a small garden shed was heavily damaged.
EF0	E of Andalusia	Covington	AL	31.3141°N 86.4634°W	21:23–21:24	0.51 mi (0.82 km)	150 yd (140 m)	Several homes sustained shingle damage to their roofs, several trees were toppled, and several campers and RVs were overturned. Numerous water pipes were tossed at the Covington County Water Authority. One person was injured. Total economic damage reached $100,000.
EF1	SW of Cataula	Harris	GA	32.623435°N 84.905733°W	21:36–21:39	2.3 mi (3.7 km)	250 yd (230 m)	Dozens of trees were snapped or uprooted, and power poles were downed. Total economic damage reached $150,000.
EF2	SSW of Harperville	Scott	MS	32.4393°N 89.5248°W	22:07–22:17	4.83 mi (7.77 km)	880 yd (800 m)	Multiple flea market buildings, barns, and sheds were destroyed. Several homes sustained damage, while widespread damage to trees and power lines was also observed. Total economic damage reached $350,000.
EF1	S of Garlandville	Jasper	MS	32.15°N 89.12°W	23:23–23:31	3.09 mi (4.97 km)	50 yd (46 m)	Several trees were snapped or uprooted, and the roof of a porch sustained damage. Total economic damage reached $100,000.
EF0	NW of Cadiz	Trigg	KY	36.8842°N 87.9365°W	01:40–01:45	2 mi (3.2 km)	50 yd (46 m)	At least a dozen trees were broken or uprooted, with one power line partially downed by a fallen tree. Several pieces of metal roofing were ripped from a barn. Total economic damage reached $25,000.
EF1	Lawtey	Bradford	FL	30.046°N 82.0734°W	03:00–03:01	1 mi (1.6 km)	75 yd (69 m)	A brief tornado damaged an elementary school and downed numerous trees and power lines. Two people were injured.
EF1	S of St. Johns	St. Johns	FL	29.96°N 81.53°W	03:37–03:40	0.6 mi (0.97 km)	160 yd (150 m)	Two homes sustained significant roof and exterior damage.

=== February 9 event ===
List of confirmed tornadoes – Thursday, February 9, 2017
EF#	Location	County / Parish	State	Start Coord.	Time (UTC)	Path length	Max width
EF2	SE of Brooklet to S of Guyton	Bulloch, Effingham	GA	32.34°N 81.56°W	08:51–09:03	9.81 mi (15.79 km)	300 yd (270 m)
EF2	Several mobile homes were severely damaged or completely destroyed, including a few that were tossed 30–40 ft (10–13 yd) from their foundations. A car was pushed 20–30 ft (6.7–10.0 yd), a large metal trucking container was moved about 50 ft (17 yd), and hundreds of trees were snapped or uprooted. A few residences sustained damage, and one had its carport completely torn from the roof. Several cars were damaged. Seven people were injured.						

=== February 14 event ===
List of confirmed tornadoes – Tuesday, February 14, 2017
EF#	Location	County / Parish	State	Start Coord.	Time (UTC)	Path length	Max width
EF0	ENE of Wharton	Wharton	TX	29.334°N 96.09°W	13:40–13:45	1 mi (1.6 km)	200 yd (180 m)
EF0	A weak tornado damaged or uprooted numerous trees. A microburst took place along the right side of the tornado track. Total economic damage reached $10,000.						
EF1	Van Vleck	Matagorda	TX	29.0227°N 95.8997°W	14:15–14:20	1.72 mi (2.77 km)	300 yd (270 m)
EF1	Multiple homes were damaged in residential areas of town, trees were snapped, and recreational vehicles were flipped. Six people were injured. Total economic damage reached $900,000.						
EF2	WSW of First Colony	Fort Bend	TX	29.541°N 95.7149°W	14:21–14:25	0.68 mi (1.09 km)	300 yd (270 m)
EF2	A large abandoned grain dryer was severely damaged, several large metal silos were completely destroyed, and a large anchored garage was completely demolished. A pick-up truck was moved and a car inside the garage was lifted. Several homes sustained structural damage or damage to their porches and windows. A wrought iron metal fence was heavily damaged. Many other fences and numerous trees were downed. Total economic damage reached $1,000,000.						
EF0	SE of Richmond	Fort Bend	TX	29.5414°N 95.7016°W	14:27–14:30	0.6 mi (0.97 km)	30 yd (27 m)
EF0	Several homes suffered roof damage, as well as fence and tree loss. Total economic damage reached $500,000.						
EF0	Northern Stafford	Fort Bend	TX	29.6335°N 95.5668°W	14:34–14:36	0.4 mi (0.64 km)	200 yd (180 m)
EF0	A 400 lb (180 kg) air conditioning unit was shifted on the roof of a business. Numerous greenhouses were damaged at a nursery, and metal storage buildings were damaged or destroyed. Businesses had their windows shattered as well. Total economic damage reached $200,000.						
EF0	Missouri City	Fort Bend	TX	29.592°N 95.5819°W	14:38–14:41	0.76 mi (1.22 km)	100 yd (91 m)
EF0	Several homes in town sustained minor damage to roofs and fences; two chimneys were ripped off houses. Total economic damage reached $150,000.						
EF0	Sweeny	Brazoria	TX	29.0364°N 95.746°W	14:40–14:45	1.49 mi (2.40 km)	150 yd (140 m)
EF0	A metal awning and large tree limbs were downed. Total economic damage reached $100,000.						

=== February 15 event ===
List of confirmed tornadoes – Wednesday, February 15, 2017
EF#	Location	County / Parish	State	Start Coord.	Time (UTC)	Path length	Max width
EF1	N of Conway	Horry	SC	33.9429°N 79.0012°W	16:30–16:40	4.92 mi (7.92 km)	60 yd (55 m)
EF1	Numerous farm buildings and sheds were damaged or destroyed. One home sustained minor damage while another had its windows blown out. Numerous trees were snapped or uprooted. A single-wide mobile home was nearly toppled, and several other trailers sustained minor damage. Total economic damage reached $997,000.						
EF1	NW of Longwood	Brunswick	NC	34.0060°N 78.6088°W	16:53–16:58	3.18 mi (5.12 km)	60 yd (55 m)
EF1	Two homes sustained roof damage, one of which was damaged significantly. A poorly constructed barn and vehicles were damaged as well. Dozens of pine trees were snapped. Total economic damage reached $80,000.						

=== February 19 event ===
List of confirmed tornadoes – Sunday, February 19, 2017
EF#	Location	County / Parish	State	Start Coord.	Time (UTC)	Path length	Max width
EF2	Northern San Antonio	Bexar	TX	29.4907°N 98.4991°W	04:36–04:43	4.64 mi (7.47 km)	600 yd (550 m)
EF2	Tornado caused severe damage in the Ridgeview and Alamo Heights neighborhoods of San Antonio, touching down at the San Pedro Golf Course and dissipating just south of Northeast Baptist Hospital. Numerous apartment buildings and homes along the path were damaged, including some homes that had their roofs completely removed. A strip mall sustained minor damage to its facade, a gas station canopy was damaged, a large office building had metal roofing peeled off, and sheds and garages were destroyed. Many trees, power poles, and signs were downed along the path as well. In total, two homes were destroyed, 77 sustained major damage, 55 sustained minor damage, and 120 homes were affected.						
EF0	Eastern Windcrest	Bexar	TX	29.5016°N 98.3601°W	04:42–04:45	1.61 mi (2.59 km)	100 yd (91 m)
EF0	Trees and tree limbs were damaged, and homes sustained roof and carport damage. A small shed was destroyed as well. In total, four homes sustained major damage, six homes sustained minor damage, and 74 homes were affected.						
EF1	Northern San Antonio	Bexar	TX	29.5551°N 98.4117°W	04:43–04:49	3 mi (4.8 km)	200 yd (180 m)
EF1	Tornado moved through residential areas near the Northern Hills Golf Club. Numerous trees and fences were downed, and homes sustained roof damage, one of which sustained near total destruction of its attached garage. A metal truss tower was toppled over, though it was not structurally sound. In total, 22 homes sustained major damage, 12 homes sustained minor damage, and 81 homes were affected.						
EF0	Northeastern Garden Ridge	Comal	TX	29.6714°N 98.2650°W	05:00–05:02	0.7 mi (1.1 km)	100 yd (91 m)
EF0	Weak and brief tornado struck a subdivision in the northeastern part of Garden Ridge, snapping large tree limbs along its path.						
EF0	S of Seguin	Guadalupe	TX	29.4605°N 97.9487°W	05:16–05:18	0.23 mi (0.37 km)	75 yd (69 m)
EF0	Several recreational vehicles were overturned, and several sheds, outbuildings, and the roof of a home were damaged.						
EF1	SSE of Wimberley to SW of Kyle	Hays	TX	29.9156°N 98.0480°W	05:26–05:35	9.75 mi (15.69 km)	300 yd (270 m)
EF1	A small business sustained considerable structural damage, and trees were snapped; one tree fell on a vehicle.						
EF0	NNW of Niederwald to NW of Mustang Ridge	Hays, Travis	TX	30.0361°N 97.7415°W	05:48–05:51	3 mi (4.8 km)	100 yd (91 m)
EF0	An aluminum barn structure was destroyed, carports were damaged, and large tree limbs were snapped. Multiple mobile homes had significant roof damage.						

=== February 20 event ===
List of confirmed tornadoes – Monday, February 20, 2017
EF#	Location	County / Parish	State	Start Coord.	Time (UTC)	Path length	Max width
EF2	Thrall	Williamson	TX	30.5501°N 97.3594°W	06:25–06:33	9.4 mi (15.1 km)	200 yd (180 m)
EF2	First of two simultaneous tornadoes. Six homes sustained major roof damage outside of town, one of which consisted of a metal building system that had its roof purlins buckled. Minor damage to buildings occurred in Thrall, and power poles were snapped at the local high school. Twelve railroad cars east of town were blown off their tracks and may have also been affected by straight-line winds up to 138 mph (222 km/h).						
EF2	SE of Taylor to S of Thrall	Williamson	TX	30.5443°N 97.3525°W	06:28–06:31	4.24 mi (6.82 km)	100 yd (91 m)
EF2	Second of two simultaneous tornadoes moved through the rural community of Noack. A three-bin grain storage facility had its bins completely destroyed and swept from their foundations. An extension of the Christ Lutheran Church of Noack sustained damage to its anchor-bolted exterior walls.						

=== February 25 event ===
List of confirmed tornadoes – Saturday, February 25, 2017
EF#	Location	County / Parish	State	Start Coord.	Time (UTC)	Path length	Max width
EF2	Plains to S of Dunmore	Luzerne, Lackawanna	PA	41.2525°N 75.7638°W	19:35–19:50	12.52 mi (20.15 km)	500 yd (460 m)
EF2	A metal horse barn and two homes sustained severe damage, while 28 additional houses sustained varying amounts of damage. A thousand trees were downed. Total economic losses were estimated at $300,000.						
EF1	Northern La Plata to E of Waldorf	Charles	MD	38.5551°N 76.9841°W	20:06–20:17	8.44 mi (13.58 km)	125 yd (114 m)
EF1	Numerous trees were snapped or uprooted, downing power lines and blocking roadways. Some trees and limbs fell on homes and garages. Several homes had their shingles and eaves ripped off; siding and insulation was removed as well. A carport was lifted and collapsed on a few vehicles.						
EF1	E of Hallam	York	PA	39.9982°N 76.5922°W	20:15–20:17	1.7 mi (2.7 km)	100 yd (91 m)
EF1	Trees were snapped and uprooted, one of which fell into a house causing substantial damage. Another home had a section of its roof, including the substructure, ripped off. Barn roofs sustained damage as well. Total economic losses were estimated at $200,000.						
EF0	Goshen	Hampshire	MA	42.4086°N 72.7970°W	00:18	0.14 mi (0.23 km)	10 yd (9.1 m)
EF0	This tornado and the following tornado were the first Massachusetts tornadoes on record during the month of February. Several pine trees were snapped, and two homes were damaged by falling trees. Total economic losses were estimated at $34,000.						
EF1	Conway	Franklin	MA	42.4850°N 72.7528°W	00:20–00:25	4.64 mi (7.47 km)	200 yd (180 m)
EF1	This tornado and the previous tornado were the first Massachusetts tornadoes on record during the month of February. Several houses were severely damaged, with roofs blown off, and one house had its side walls removed. A large barn was collapsed, numerous power lines were downed, and many pine trees were snapped. One person was injured when a tree fell on their house. Total economic losses were estimated at $01.						

=== February 28 event ===
List of confirmed tornadoes – Tuesday, February 28, 2017
EF#	Location	County / Parish	State	Start Coord.	Time (UTC)	Path length	Max width	Summary
EF1	SW of Castleton to SE of Bradford	Stark, Bureau	IL	41.1113°N 89.7134°W	22:12–22:20	5.53 mi (8.90 km)	100 yd (91 m)	Minor tree, outbuilding, and house damage occurred in and around the town of Castleton. Minor damage to crops and tree branches occurred near Bradford as well.
EF0	NW of Cedar Point	LaSalle	IL	41.2785°N 89.1627°W	22:27–22:30	1.75 mi (2.82 km)	50 yd (46 m)	Storm spotter photos and videos confirmed a tornado. No damage occurred.
EF3	W of Naplate to NW of Marseilles	LaSalle	IL	41.3239°N 88.9504°W	22:41–22:59	11.5 mi (18.5 km)	800 yd (730 m)	2 deaths – This strong multiple-vortex tornado first significantly damaged a nursing home and the LaSalle County Highway Department building at high-end EF2 strength. The tornado then reached EF3 intensity and caused major structural damage to many homes and other buildings in Naplate, including a glass plant that was partially destroyed. One home in town was blown off its foundation and left with only interior walls intact, with a nearby vehicle thrown 30 yards. The tornado weakened to EF1 strength as it moved through the southern part of Ottawa, damaging many homes and trees before dissipating near Marseilles. Two men in Ottawa were killed by a falling tree, and fourteen other people were injured. This was the northernmost February EF3 tornado on record in Illinois.
EF1	NE of Marseilles	LaSalle	IL	41.3648°N 88.7066°W	22:58–23:02	2.8 mi (4.5 km)	200 yd (180 m)	This high-end EF1 tornado caused considerable damage to two farmsteads. Grain bins were destroyed, semi-trailers were rolled over, tree branches were snapped, and a boat was moved. A farm house had major roof damage. Power poles were slightly bent over, and a communications tower was damaged as well.
EF0	NNE of Seneca	Grundy	IL	41.3753°N 88.5841°W	23:04–23:06	1.2 mi (1.9 km)	200 yd (180 m)	Video evidence of a tornado was relayed, with debris found along Interstate 80.
EF1	SSE of Daysville	Ogle	IL	41.9478°N 89.3098°W	23:07–23:09	1.5 mi (2.4 km)	50 yd (46 m)	Farm equipment was toppled, outbuildings were collapsed, homes had their roofs damaged, and large branches were snapped off of trees. This was the northernmost February tornado on record in Illinois.
EF0	N of Peoria	Peoria	IL	40.8645°N 89.6086°W	23:10–23:11	0.07 mi (0.11 km)	25 yd (23 m)	A tornado briefly touched down in a field.
EF0	Rome	Peoria	IL	40.878°N 89.5212°W	23:15–23:17	0.89 mi (1.43 km)	100 yd (91 m)	A few buildings and several trees were damaged. Total economic losses were estimated at $75,000.
EF3	W of Washburn to Rutland	Woodford, Marshall, LaSalle	IL	40.9128°N 89.3609°W	23:26–23:50	17.77 mi (28.60 km)	600 yd (550 m)	West of Washburn, this strong tornado struck multiple farmsteads, destroying barns, outbuildings, and grain bins as well as damaging several homes. A house at one farmstead sustained high-end EF3 damage, being completely leveled with the subflooring partially collapsed into the basement. This home was bolted to its foundation, though a vehicle parked in the garage was not moved, preventing a higher rating. Another home had its roof ripped off, while a third sustained shingle and window damage. The tornado then struck the northern part of Washburn at high-end EF2 strength, ripping roofs off of many well-built homes, a few of which sustained some failure of exterior walls. One home in town had a car thrown into it. Several additional farmsteads sustained EF2 damage east of Washburn before the tornado weakened to EF1 strength and struck Rutland, where minor tree and roof damage occurred before the tornado dissipated. Many trees were snapped and uprooted along the path. Total economic losses were estimated at $2,000,000.
EF0	Folletts	Clinton	IA	41.7535°N 90.3582°W	23:53	0.04 mi (0.064 km)	25 yd (23 m)	An emergency manager reported a brief tornado in a farm field. No damage occurred.
EF2	WSW of Long Point	LaSalle, Livingston	IL	40.9856°N 88.9865°W	23:53–23:59	4.5 mi (7.2 km)	75 yd (69 m)	Trees were snapped or uprooted. One home had its entire roof ripped off and sustained some collapse of exterior walls.
EF1	WNW of Lesterville	Reynolds	MO	37.4409°N 90.9138°W	00:40–00:48	4.36 mi (7.02 km)	80 yd (73 m)	A camper and many trees were damaged.
EF1	Higginson	White	AR	35.1900°N 91.7300°W	01:03–01:05	1.37 mi (2.20 km)	120 yd (110 m)	Numerous trees were snapped or uprooted, power lines were downed, vehicles were flipped, and highway signs were snapped at the base as a result of this high-end EF1 tornado. Several homes sustained damage to their roofs, including a few that sustained total removal of their roofs. Four people were injured. Total economic losses were estimated at $50,000.
EF2	Kensett	White	AR	35.2220°N 91.6800°W	01:07–01:09	1.1 mi (1.8 km)	250 yd (230 m)	Multiple homes sustained damage along the path. A few homes sustained collapse of exterior walls, one of which was largely destroyed. A mobile home was destroyed, and shops and outbuildings were damaged as well. One person was injured. Total economic losses were estimated at $70,000.
EF0	N of Silver Mine to NNW of Oak Grove	Madison	MO	37.5777°N 90.4997°W	01:16–01:22	4.44 mi (7.15 km)	50 yd (46 m)	Trees were snapped and toppled, several gravestones were moved or downed, and a large hay barn sustained structural damage.
EF4	N of Silver Lake, MO to SW of Christopher, IL	Perry (MO), Randolph (IL), Jackson (IL), Franklin (IL)	MO, IL	37.7238°N 90.0055°W	01:51–02:57	53.47 mi (86.05 km)	1,100 yd (1,000 m)	1 death – See article on this tornado – 12 people were injured. Total economic losses were estimated at $14,800,000.
EF1	Niles	Berrien	MI	41.8310°N 86.2407°W	01:54–01:56	0.57 mi (0.92 km)	100 yd (91 m)	A tornado touched down near Eastside Elementary School. Numerous trees and homes were damaged across a five block area in town, with some trees landing on homes and vehicles, and a City of Niles public works maintenance building was damaged as well.
EF1	N of Pokagon to Dowagiac	Cass	MI	41.9478°N 86.1760°W	01:58–02:02	4.99 mi (8.03 km)	100 yd (91 m)	A tornado touched down in an open field and tracked into Dowagiac. Two single-wide mobile homes were destroyed, multiple homes sustained minor damage, and widespread tree damage occurred.
EF1	S of Vandalia	Cass	MI	41.8782°N 85.9497°W	02:12–02:15	2.7 mi (4.3 km)	150 yd (140 m)	Several large trees were snapped or uprooted, and chain link fence was pulled from the ground. The Calvin Center Seventh-day Adventist Church had siding and shingles ripped off. A single-wide mobile home had its roof ripped off, a garage had its roof partially torn off, and a two-story house was shifted on its foundation and sustained damage to its roof. Other houses sustained minor roof and siding damage.
EF1	E of Centreville	St. Joseph	MI	41.9176°N 85.4913°W	02:38–02:40	2.04 mi (3.28 km)	50 yd (46 m)	Several trees were damaged; one penetrated the roof of a shed while a second crushed part of an RV trailer. A second RV trailer was pushed over, a large barn and smaller outbuilding both sustained roof damage, and a residence had its shingles damaged.
EF1	E of Coleta	Whiteside	IL	41.8883°N 89.7512°W	02:44–02:46	2.62 mi (4.22 km)	75 yd (69 m)	Pine trees were snapped and farm outbuildings were damaged. A home had its and a part of its garage's roof removed. A second house also sustained roof damage.
EF1	Versailles	Brown	IL	39.8845°N 90.6636°W	03:33–03:34	0.66 mi (1.06 km)	50 yd (46 m)	Two single-wide mobile home trailers were overturned. Numerous trees were snapped or uprooted. Many structures sustained roof, siding, and fascia damage. One person was injured.
EF1	W of Cherry	Bureau	IL	41.4151°N 89.2608°W	03:43–03:46	2.33 mi (3.75 km)	50 yd (46 m)	Although damage was mainly to trees, a farm shed was completely destroyed.
EF3	SW of Crossville, IL to S of Oakland City, IN	White (IL), Posey (IN), Gibson (IN)	IL, IN	38.16°N 88.06°W	03:55–04:47	44.13 mi (71.02 km)	440 yd (400 m)	1 death – See section on this tornado – Two people were injured. Total economic losses were estimated at $5,700,000.
EF0	Boydsville to Lynn Grove	Graves, Calloway	KY	36.5021°N 88.5311°W	04:35–04:47	8.8 mi (14.2 km)	30 yd (27 m)	Hundreds of trees were snapped, several were uprooted, and several barn roofs sustained minor damage.
EF1	WNW of Farlington	Crawford	KS	37.6503°N 94.9603°W	04:37–04:38	0.1 mi (0.16 km)	75 yd (69 m)	One outbuilding was destroyed and two others were heavily damaged. Farm equipment items were heavily damaged or thrown.
EF1	SE of Carterville	Williamson	IL	37.7385°N 89.0626°W	04:44–04:54	7.36 mi (11.84 km)	25 yd (23 m)	A tornado produced mainly tree damage, with a few uprooted and many limbs broken.
EF0	NNE of Farlington	Crawford	KS	37.63°N 94.82°W	04:43–04:44	0.1 mi (0.16 km)	75 yd (69 m)	Two carports were destroyed, and two homes were damaged. A tree was downed.
EF2	WSW of Ireland	Dubois	IN	38.42°N 87.00°W	05:03–05:08	4.1 mi (6.6 km)	200 yd (180 m)	A large pole barn was destroyed and multiple homes sustained extensive damage as a result of this high-end EF2 tornado, including one house with its roof ripped off and walls partially collapsed.
EF1	NE of Linton	Trigg	KY	36.7365°N 87.8813°W	05:28–05:38	8.58 mi (13.81 km)	400 yd (370 m)	Hundreds of trees were snapped or uprooted, a grain bin was destroyed, numerous barns sustained major structural damage, and many homes sustained roof and siding damage.

== March ==
Confirmed tornadoes by Enhanced Fujita rating
EFU	EF0	EF1	EF2	EF3	EF4	EF5	Total
7	72	91	23	1	0	0	194

=== March 1 event ===
List of confirmed tornadoes – Wednesday, March 1, 2017
EF#	Location	County / Parish	State	Start Coord.	Time (UTC)	Path length	Max width	Summary
EF0	NNW of Buffalo	Dallas	MO	37.6839°N 93.1067°W	06:30–06:31	1 mi (1.6 km)	100 yd (91 m)	Several trees snapped and downed. Several barns and outbuildings sustained damage, including one that was completely destroyed. A truck sustained severe damage from flying debris, and a home sustained severe roof damage.
EF1	SE of Rochester	Butler	KY	37.184°N 86.88°W	06:35–06:37	0.78 mi (1.26 km)	90 yd (82 m)	Trees were snapped, uprooted, and twisted, and one building was damaged.
EF1	W of Lebanon	Laclede	MO	—N/a	06:56	0.1 mi (0.16 km)	200 yd (180 m)	A frame home and two mobile homes sustained minor roof damage. Numerous trees were snapped or uprooted.
EF1	S of Lamar	Johnson	AR	35.4203°N 93.3852°W	07:29–07:30	0.14 mi (0.23 km)	200 yd (180 m)	A home sustained severe roof damage.
EF0	S of Leesburg	Highland	OH	39.2991°N 83.5968°W	07:31–07:39	6.87 mi (11.06 km)	250 yd (230 m)	One barn was destroyed, a second was partially collapsed, and a third had its top half removed. Several outbuildings were heavily damaged or destroyed. A garage was destroyed, a fence was flattened, and several houses sustained minor damage. Numerous trees were snapped or uprooted.
EF0	SW of Greenfield	Highland	OH	39.2754°N 83.4669°W	07:40–07:45	4.53 mi (7.29 km)	100 yd (91 m)	Several trees were snapped or downed, a small unanchored shed was removed from its foundation, and a barn had part of its roof ripped off.
EF1	ENE of Cleveland	Conway	AR	35.4372°N 92.6235°W	08:16–08:17	1 mi (1.6 km)	250 yd (230 m)	The door of an outbuilding was uplifted, causing significant damage to the roof. Another outbuilding was pushed off its foundation and severely damaged. Several trees were uprooted.
EF0	W of Austin	Conway	AR	35.4439°N 92.5602°W	08:18–08:19	1.1 mi (1.8 km)	50 yd (46 m)	A roof was damaged, and a few barns were destroyed.
EF1	SE of Higden	Cleburne	AR	35.4617°N 92.2345°W	08:33–08:38	3.9 mi (6.3 km)	250 yd (230 m)	Many trees were snapped, downed, or uprooted. A home had its windows blown out and roof damaged. Several outbuildings were damaged as well.
EF1	Amelia	Clermont	OH	39.0258°N 84.2955°W	08:38–08:47	6.39 mi (10.28 km)	150 yd (140 m)	Numerous trees and a few power poles were snapped by this high-end EF1 tornado that moved directly through Amelia. One home had its roof completely lifted off and displaced while other houses sustained damage to their shingles and siding.
EF1	S of Possum Grape	Jackson	AR	35.4538°N 91.4619°W	09:13–09:17	4.24 mi (6.82 km)	200 yd (180 m)	Numerous large trees were snapped or uprooted by this high-end EF1 tornado, including one that crushed a tractor. Several homes sustained mainly roof damage; one had most of its roof removed.
EF1	SE of Diaz	Jackson	AR	35.6362°N 91.2627°W	09:20–09:22	1.6 mi (2.6 km)	125 yd (114 m)	High-end EF1 tornado snapped and uprooted many trees and snapped power poles. A few residences sustained structural damage, and home had the back of a garage blown out and part of the roof removed. Road signs and a storage building were destroyed as well.
EF2	S of Washington	Daviess	IN	38.5991°N 87.1394°W	10:00–10:01	0.15 mi (0.24 km)	30 yd (27 m)	A brief tornado caused considerable damage to a home's attached garage, which had its garage doors and exterior walls blown out. A pole barn was destroyed as well.
EF1	SW of Montgomery	Daviess	IN	38.66°N 87.08°W	10:00	0.03 mi (0.048 km)	25 yd (23 m)	A brief tornado snapped and uprooted multiple trees.
EF2	S of Montgomery	Daviess	IN	38.6573°N 87.0782°W	10:05–10:06	1.52 mi (2.45 km)	30 yd (27 m)	A brief tornado snapped very large trees and collapsed a metal truss tower that was built on a two-legged base.
EF0	W of Carbondale	Jackson	IL	37.7013°N 89.3705°W	10:08–10:13	4.11 mi (6.61 km)	25 yd (23 m)	A few trees were uprooted and large tree branches were downed.
EF1	SE of Montgomery	Daviess	IN	38.6443°N 87.0011°W	10:10–10:11	0.04 mi (0.064 km)	30 yd (27 m)	A brief tornado lifted a garage off of its foundation and destroyed it. A camper was lofted 30 yards (27 m) and destroyed as well.
EF1	W of Mitchell	Lawrence	IN	38.7281°N 86.5129°W	10:30–10:31	0.21 mi (0.34 km)	40 yd (37 m)	Roofing from a barn and a house were tossed 100 yd (91 m). Insulation was scattered, the east wall of the house and garage was displaced, a lamp post was broken, trees were uprooted.
EF2	NW of Saltillo	Lawrence, Orange	IN	38.69°N 86.3406°W	10:37–10:39	0.68 mi (1.09 km)	25 yd (23 m)	Three metal chicken barns were collapsed, some outbuildings and barns were damaged or destroyed, and two mobile homes were destroyed while another was rolled over onto a vehicle. One person was injured.
EF1	SSE of Sikeston to NNE of Anniston	New Madrid, Mississippi	MO	36.8203°N 89.5762°W	10:40–10:52	15.21 mi (24.48 km)	200 yd (180 m)	A garage was completely destroyed, with the associated home sustaining roof damage. Several barns were damaged, dozens of trees were snapped or uprooted, numerous power poles were snapped, and dozens of irrigation systems were blown over. One person was injured.
EF0	Dyersburg	Dyer	TN	36.0422°N 89.3566°W	10:51–10:54	3.71 mi (5.97 km)	50 yd (46 m)	One barn sustained significant damage while a second had its roof ripped off. A home sustained shingle damage, and outbuildings were damaged. Intermittent tree damage was observed.
EF1	NE of Saltillo	Washington	IN	38.681°N 86.28°W	10:41–10:47	5.8 mi (9.3 km)	100 yd (91 m)	Hundreds of trees were snapped or uprooted. Several outbuildings were heavily damaged or destroyed. Several residences were damaged either by flying debris or by tornadic winds.
EF2	W of Crothersville	Jackson	IN	38.7991°N 86.0166°W	10:45–10:46	0.25 mi (0.40 km)	50 yd (46 m)	A garage was lifted up and partially off its foundation, resting it atop a pickup truck. A frame home had a majority of its roof ripped off. A 25 ft (8.3 yd) trailer was lifted and flipped onto its side. The tornado was embedded within straight-line winds up to 115 mph (185 km/h) that collapsed three metal transmission towers.
EF1	Borden	Clark	IN	38.468°N 85.952°W	11:04–11:05	0.33 mi (0.53 km)	20 yd (18 m)	Numerous trees were snapped or uprooted in town. An old building, a garage, a house, and a church all sustained roof damage.
EF1	SSW of Scottsburg	Scott	IN	38.627°N 85.784°W	11:05–11:07	2.15 mi (3.46 km)	125 yd (114 m)	A large cinderblock building had one of its walls collapsed, and two metal outbuildings were destroyed. One unanchored mobile home was destroyed while a second was flipped. A large garage was destroyed, a double-wide manufactured home was pushed off its foundation, and numerous trees were snapped or uprooted. Three people were injured.
EF2	E of Cuba	Graves	KY	36.5827°N 88.6263°W	11:25–11:27	1.55 mi (2.49 km)	200 yd (180 m)	This tornado was embedded in a larger area of straight-line winds. A frame home was heavily damaged and had much of its roof torn off. At a cemetery, many headstones weighing hundreds of pounds were blown over, some of which were thrown up to 30 ft (10 yd) away and driven into the ground. A nearby church sustained damage to its roof. A machine shed was completely swept away, and a mobile home was shifted and damaged. Dozens of trees were snapped or uprooted as well.
EF1	NNE of Campbellsburg	Henry	KY	38.553°N 85.211°W	11:36–11:38	1.08 mi (1.74 km)	200 yd (180 m)	Numerous barns, a large grain bin, and a few smaller outbuildings were destroyed, and an anchored mobile home was pushed off its foundation. Trees were snapped or uprooted and a truck was overturned.
EF0	Anderson Township	Hamilton	OH	39.0699°N 84.3925°W	12:03–12:04	1.05 mi (1.69 km)	350 yd (320 m)	Numerous trees were snapped or uprooted, many of which fell on homes and caused damage. Approximately 50 homes were damaged in the Anderson Township area.
EF1	S of New Market	Highland	OH	39.1078°N 83.6814°W	12:39–12:41	2.19 mi (3.52 km)	150 yd (140 m)	Three barns and a dog kennel sustained significant roof removal, and other outbuildings sustained lesser damage. A house sustained minor roof damage and several broken windows, as well partial siding loss. Trees were snapped or downed.
EF1	E of Adairville	Logan	KY	36.659°N 86.835°W	12:57–12:59	1.57 mi (2.53 km)	75 yd (69 m)	A house sustained minor roof damage, trees were downed, a small outbuilding was damaged, and a large barn lost a significant portion of its roof structure.
EF1	NNW of Franklin to SE of Brentwood	Williamson	TN	35.9545°N 86.883°W	13:00–13:09	10.48 mi (16.87 km)	250 yd (230 m)	This tornado moved through the southern suburbs of Nashville, including Cool Springs. Roughly 500 homes and businesses were damaged, and many trees were downed, some of which landed on structures. Small outbuildings were also destroyed. Carrie Underwood's house was hit by the tornado, and had its chimney blown off while tree limbs were also downed on the property. A Lexus dealership had its doors blown in, a hotel sustained minor damage, and an auto shop had its garage doors blown in as well.
EF0	Northern Lavergne	Davidson, Rutherford	TN	36.0398°N 86.5971°W	13:17–13:20	3.15 mi (5.07 km)	100 yd (91 m)	The Four Corners Marina sustained extensive damage to its docks, boats, and shelters as well, and small outbuildings were destroyed. Sporadic tree damage occurred, and several homes sustained minor damage.
EF1	NW of Waverly	Pike	OH	39.1583°N 83.0228°W	13:16–13:17	0.57 mi (0.92 km)	125 yd (114 m)	Many trees were snapped or uprooted, three outbuildings were destroyed, one house sustained partial roof removal, and a second house sustained minor structural damage.
EF1	SE of Bowling Green	Warren	KY	36.906°N 86.273°W	13:24–13:28	2.63 mi (4.23 km)	125 yd (114 m)	Numerous sheds, metal buildings, dog houses, and other outbuildings were destroyed by this high-end EF1 tornado. One home had its back wall bent inward while its roof was severely damaged. Several vehicles were slid and moved. Numerous trees were snapped, uprooted, and twisted. Several other homes sustained various degrees of roof and porch damage. A 300 lb (140 kg) fuel tank was blown over.
EF0	W of Watertown	Wilson	TN	36.0971°N 86.2501°W	13:37–13:41	3.32 mi (5.34 km)	100 yd (91 m)	Dozens of trees were snapped or uprooted, and an outbuilding was destroyed.
EF1	N of Watertown	Wilson, Smith	TN	36.0989°N 86.1678°W	13:40–13:48	7.17 mi (11.54 km)	200 yd (180 m)	A home and garage sustained significant damage, although the garage was not properly attached to the foundation. Two TVA high transmission power poles were snapped. Several other houses sustained minor roof and tree damage, including a greenhouse that was completely destroyed, and numerous trees were downed. A large swath of straight-line wind damage associated with rear flank downdraft winds caused widespread tree and structural damage along U.S. Highway 70 in Watertown.
EF1	S of Hickman	Smith	TN	36.1167°N 85.9809°W	13:51–13:56	3.91 mi (6.29 km)	200 yd (180 m)	An old home being used as a storage building was destroyed, and two site-built homes and a mobile home sustained minor exterior damage. A barn was destroyed, a second barn was damaged, and many trees were downed.
EF1	S of Bloomington Springs	Putnam	TN	36.1461°N 85.7526°W	14:02–14:13	7.62 mi (12.26 km)	150 yd (140 m)	Dozens of large trees were snapped and uprooted, and small outbuildings were destroyed. A few houses sustained minor roof damage.
EF1	N of Langsville	Meigs	OH	39.0577°N 82.1854°W	14:07–14:08	0.05 mi (0.080 km)	300 yd (270 m)	Several trees were snapped or uprooted. A small aluminum shed was ripped off its wooden foundation, blown to the northeast, and mangled. A porch was ripped off a home, landing on the other side. A large barn had its roof ripped off and two side walls collapsed.
EF1	E of Monterey	Putnam	TN	36.15°N 85.2377°W	14:35–14:36	0.11 mi (0.18 km)	90 yd (82 m)	A few outbuildings were destroyed, a house sustained minor structural damage, and large trees were snapped or uprooted.
EF1	NW of Chatsworth	Murray	GA	34.7755°N 84.8207°W	21:27–21:31	2.88 mi (4.63 km)	150 yd (140 m)	A barn was destroyed, and a semi trailer was overturned at a tractor trailer storage facility. Numerous trees were snapped or uprooted. An industrial building had a large section of its roof peeled back, and an apartment complex sustained significant shingle damage. At a baseball field, a fence was downed, a cinder block wall was toppled, bleachers were tossed onto the field, and the press box was damaged. A carport was collapsed onto a car and home.

=== March 5 event ===
List of confirmed tornadoes – Sunday, March 5, 2017
EF#	Location	County / Parish	State	Start Coord.	Time (UTC)	Path length	Max width
EF0	Elmaton	Matagorda	TX	28.8844°N 96.1457°W	17:55–17:57	0.01 mi (0.016 km)	30 yd (27 m)
EF0	A tornado was videoed in an open field.						
EF0	SE of Sweeny	Brazoria	TX	28.94°N 95.56°W	18:05–18:06	0.01 m (1.0×10^{−5} km)	20 yd (0.011 mi)
EF0	Law enforcement reported a brief tornado.						

=== March 6 event ===
List of confirmed tornadoes – Monday, March 6, 2017
EF#	Location	County / Parish	State	Start Coord.	Time (UTC)	Path length	Max width	Summary
EF1	NW of Bricelyn to N of Walters	Faribault	MN	43.5701°N 93.8204°W	23:04–23:15	9.32 mi (15.00 km)	200 yd (180 m)	Trees were uprooted, power poles were snapped, and homes sustained roof and window damage. Garages, barns, and sheds were heavily damaged or destroyed as well. The most concentrated area of damage occurred at a campground, with an unanchored mobile home being lofted and moved 15 feet at that location. This was the earliest known Minnesota tornado on record in the calendar year.
EF0	NW of Lanyon to SE of Harcourt	Webster	IA	42.2348°N 94.2041°W	23:23–23:26	2.38 mi (3.83 km)	30 yd (27 m)	A storm chaser observed a small tornado lofting dust and debris into the air. No significant damage occurred.
EF1	E of Harcourt to NW of Dayton	Webster	IA	42.272°N 94.1476°W	23:28–23:32	2.87 mi (4.62 km)	50 yd (46 m)	A firefighter documented a brief tornado lofting dust and debris into the air. A hog house had its roof removed and most of its walls collapsed.
EF0	S of Manhattan	Geary	KS	39.0539°N 96.5376°W	23:35	0.1 mi (0.16 km)	50 yd (46 m)	A semi truck was blown off the road by this brief tornado.
EF0	E of Manhattan to S of St. Marys	Wabaunsee	KS	39.1548°N 96.3829°W	23:36–00:00	16.06 mi (25.85 km)	50 yd (46 m)	An intermittent tornado touched down several times, causing no damage.
EF0	N of Louisville	Pottawatomie	KS	39.2934°N 96.32°W	23:37	0.01 mi (0.016 km)	25 yd (23 m)	Emergency management relayed visual confirmation of a tornado. No damage occurred.
EF0	N of Volland	Wabaunsee	KS	39.0079°N 96.4°W	23:37–23:38	0.12 mi (0.19 km)	50 yd (46 m)	Video evidence of a tornado was received. No damage occurred.
EF1	SW of Clarks Grove to NE of Geneva	Freeborn, Steele	MN	43.7356°N 93.3505°W	23:38–23:51	14.22 mi (22.88 km)	300 yd (270 m)	This tornado first struck Clarks Grove, where a large warehouse building had walls collapsed and a large section of roof removed. Flying debris from this structure damaged surrounding buildings and vehicles, trees in town were snapped, and a large brick building had windows blown out. The tornado struck Geneva before dissipating, where trees and detached garages were damaged. Numerous barns, outbuildings, and garages were damaged or destroyed along the path.
EF1	W of Zimmerman	Sherburne	MN	45.4287°N 93.6925°W	23:39–23:55	8.78 mi (14.13 km)	300 yd (270 m)	Numerous trees were snapped, outbuildings were destroyed, and a boat was damaged. A few residences sustained minor to significant roof damage, some of which occurred as a result of falling trees and tree limbs.
EF0	W of Paxico	Wabaunsee	KS	39.07°N 96.1886°W	23:59–00:01	1.85 mi (2.98 km)	50 yd (46 m)	The roof of a barn was removed as a result of this weak tornado.
EF0	SE of Rossville	Shawnee	KS	39.1095°N 95.9236°W	00:13–00:21	5.21 mi (8.38 km)	50 yd (46 m)	A center pivot irrigation system was overturned. Minor tree damage was observed as well.
EF0	Mound City	Holt	MO	40.12°N 95.28°W	00:17–00:21	2.9 mi (4.7 km)	25 yd (23 m)	A few trees and power lines were downed in Mound City.
EF0	ENE of Luther to NE of Gilbert	Boone, Story	IA	41.9826°N 93.8958°W	00:27–00:44	17.86 mi (28.74 km)	85 yd (78 m)	Trees were uprooted or had branches snapped, power poles and outbuildings were damaged, a fifth wheel camper was flipped, and a house sustained minor shingle damage. The tornado was likely on the ground intermittently.
EF0	N of Skidmore	Nodaway	MO	40.31°N 95.09°W	00:30–00:36	5.8 mi (9.3 km)	25 yd (23 m)	The West Nodaway Fire Department reported a tornado. No damage occurred.
EF1	E of Garden City to W of Lawn Hill	Hardin	IA	42.2472°N 93.3327°W	00:58–01:04	6.32 mi (10.17 km)	300 yd (270 m)	A garage was mostly destroyed, a grain bin was damaged, and trees were uprooted or had large branches broken off.
EF0	WSW of Leon	Butler	KS	37.67°N 96.81°W	01:05–01:06	0.11 mi (0.18 km)	50 yd (46 m)	An outbuilding was slightly damaged.
EF2	N of Smithville to NE of Lathrop	Clay, Clinton	MO	39.428°N 94.5988°W	01:18–01:46	19.57 mi (31.49 km)	1,000 yd (910 m)	This high-end EF2 wedge tornado damaged or destroyed multiple homes along its path. One home was swept away with only the basement remaining, likely as a result of wind rushing into the home's basement garage. A split-level home had its second floor completely removed, a storage trailer was tossed and flipped over, and many outbuildings were destroyed. Other homes had roofs ripped off or were damaged to a lesser degree. Numerous trees and power poles were snapped along the path.
EF1	N of Liberty Center to SE of Milo	Warren	IA	41.2409°N 93.4915°W	01:19–01:24	4.83 mi (7.77 km)	100 yd (91 m)	A garage was destroyed, with debris lofted up to 150 yards (140 m), a residence had numerous windows blown out, and outbuildings were damaged or destroyed. Trees were uprooted and large branches were broken off as well.
EF1	NW of Melcher-Dallas to SSE of Pleasantville	Marion	IA	41.2765°N 93.291°W	01:29–01:34	5.33 mi (8.58 km)	120 yd (110 m)	A residence sustained damage to its roof and walls, an outbuilding was collapsed, and a silo was damaged.
EF1	SE of Pleasantville to S of Elk Rock State Park	Marion	IA	41.3469°N 93.2°W	01:35–01:42	6.76 mi (10.88 km)	80 yd (73 m)	Two residences sustained damage, one of which had a garage door collapsed and lost shingles. Numerous trees were snapped and large tree branches were broken.
EF1	Princeton	Franklin	KS	38.4881°N 95.2717°W	01:38–01:39	3.05 mi (4.91 km)	50 yd (46 m)	In the town of Princeton, tree and power line damage occurred. Outside of town, a majority of the roof was ripped off a home, a barn was destroyed, and outbuildings were damaged. A second house sustained minor roof damage as well.
EF1	SE of Cainsville to SW of Mercer	Mercer	MO	40.3938°N 93.753°W	01:40–01:51	10.34 mi (16.64 km)	100 yd (91 m)	A single-wide mobile home was rolled onto its side, a house sustained significant roof damage, numerous outbuildings were damaged, and trees were snapped.
EF0	E of Otley to N of Pella	Marion	IA	41.4611°N 92.9974°W	01:47–01:52	5.45 mi (8.77 km)	65 yd (59 m)	A small barn had its walls collapsed, trees were snapped or uprooted, and large tree branches were broken.
EF0	Leawood	Johnson	KS	38.8621°N 94.6249°W	01:51–01:52	0.32 mi (0.51 km)	100 yd (91 m)	Homes in a residential area near Leawood Ironwoods Park had small sections of their roofing and siding ripped off. Fences were destroyed as well.
EF1	Lee's Summit	Jackson	MO	38.9236°N 94.4079°W	02:03–02:06	2.29 mi (3.69 km)	25 yd (23 m)	A tornado primarily damaged trees, though a business sustained major roof and wall damage.
EF3	SW of Oak Grove to W of Odessa	Jackson, Lafayette	MO	38.959°N 94.2394°W	02:11–02:30	17.74 mi (28.55 km)	400 yd (370 m)	This destructive tornado moved directly through the town of Oak Grove, causing major damage. 483 homes and 10 businesses were damaged or destroyed, including a few poorly anchored homes that were leveled or swept from their foundations. Trees were downed and outbuildings were destroyed outside of town as well. Twelve people were injured, three of whom were hospitalized.
EF2	Seymour	Wayne, Appanoose	IA	40.6174°N 93.2085°W	02:16–02:29	14.92 mi (24.01 km)	250 yd (230 m)	A strong tornado touched down southwest of Seymour, inflicting major damage to trees and several farmsteads. The tornado then moved directly through town, where several homes and structures had roofs and walls ripped off. A brick school building also sustained major damage. The tornado exited Seymour and continued to the northeast, damaging a residence and farmstead before dissipating.
EF1	E of Cincinnati to NE of Exline	Appanoose	IA	40.6322°N 92.9041°W	02:30–02:37	8.01 mi (12.89 km)	60 yd (55 m)	A barn sustained roof damage, another barn had its doors collapsed, and trees were uprooted or had large branches broken.
EF2	S of Centerville to SE of Udell	Appanoose	IA	40.6891°N 92.876°W	02:33–02:42	9.66 mi (15.55 km)	90 yd (82 m)	This tornado first clipped the south side of Centerville, where a manufacturing facility sustained severe structural damage, several homes were damaged, and numerous power poles were snapped. Past Centerville, the tornado damaged a few other homes and outbuildings before dissipating near Udell.
EF1	Mayview	Lafayette	MO	39.0129°N 93.8511°W	02:34–02:36	1.75 mi (2.82 km)	50 yd (46 m)	Several structures sustained damage to their garage doors and external walls.
EF0	Southern Carrollton	Carroll	MO	39.3379°N 93.5154°W	02:40–02:46	5.97 mi (9.61 km)	100 yd (91 m)	A irrigation pivot was overturned southwest of town. In Carrollton, several structures were damaged, including a few businesses that lost a significant amount of roofing. The town's wooden welcome sign was destroyed as well. Barns and outbuildings were heavily damaged east of town before the tornado dissipated.
EF0	SW of Pilot Grove to SE of Boonville	Cooper	MO	38.8323°N 92.9597°W	02:40–02:56	17.45 mi (28.08 km)	400 yd (370 m)	Outbuildings and trees were damaged, while power poles were leant or downed.
EF1	N of Barre Mills to SSE of West Salem	La Crosse	WI	43.8564°N 91.1172°W	02:46–02:50	2.6 mi (4.2 km)	200 yd (180 m)	Intermittent damage occurred along the path. Barns and outbuildings were damaged or destroyed, and a farmhouse sustained roof damage.
EF1	NE of Brunswick to NW of Prairie Hill	Chariton	MO	39.4546°N 93.1085°W	02:56–03:16	19.81 mi (31.88 km)	100 yd (91 m)	Multiple outbuildings were destroyed, with debris scattered up to 200 yards away and wooden 2x4s speared into the ground. A house sustained minor damage, and trees were snapped and uprooted.
EF0	SE of Knob Noster to SW of La Monte	Johnson, Pettis	MO	38.7348°N 93.5327°W	03:10–03:17	3.88 mi (6.24 km)	25 yd (23 m)	Numerous outbuildings sustained major damage, several residences sustained minor damage, and many trees were snapped.
EF0	SE of Clinton	Henry	MO	38.3256°N 93.6878°W	03:17–03:26	7.79 mi (12.54 km)	25 yd (23 m)	Intermittent tornado caused minor damage along its path.
EF1	NE of Jacksonville to NE of Shelbina	Shelby	MO	36.6334°N 92.28°W	03:40–03:56	18.47 mi (29.72 km)	150 yd (140 m)	The South Shelby High School was affected, with minor roof damage, a couple of storage buildings destroyed, the baseball backstop destroyed, and the press box blown off the football field bleachers and destroyed. A nearby home had a portion of its roof ripped off. One person was injured by flying debris. Damage to trees and outbuildings occurred as well.
EF1	E of Bunch	Adair	OK	35.6562°N 94.7044°W	03:44–03:55	6.1 mi (9.8 km)	650 yd (590 m)	Tornado destroyed several outbuildings and an RV camper, caused minor damage to homes, and snapped or uprooted numerous trees. Power poles were downed as well.
EF0	SE of Bernard	Jackson, Dubuque	IA	42.2930°N 90.8302°W	03:50–03:55	5.7 mi (9.2 km)	25 yd (23 m)	A few outbuildings were destroyed, a manufactured home and a hog containment building had their roofs ripped off, and numerous trees suffered damage.
EF2	W of Grandview	Louisa	IA	41.2766°N 90.2594°W	03:56–03:57	0.31 mi (0.50 km)	150 yd (140 m)	A semi trailer was tipped over, wooden power poles were snapped, and trees were uprooted.
EF1	SSW of Quincy	Hickory	MO	37.9676°N 93.5021°W	04:00–04:01	0.75 mi (1.21 km)	100 yd (91 m)	Farm outbuildings were destroyed, and trees were uprooted.
EF2	Muscatine	Muscatine	IA	41.4092°N 91.0732°W	04:05–04:07	1.78 mi (2.86 km)	200 yd (180 m)	A short-lived but damaging tornado tracked through Muscatine, damaging more than 80 homes and several businesses. Two homes suffered total roof loss, one of which sustained collapse of exterior walls. Detached garages were destroyed, and light poles were snapped or bent to the ground. Many trees were downed along the path, and a church in downtown Muscatine sustained considerable damage.
EF2	W of Montpelier to E of Long Grove	Muscatine, Scott	IA	41.4528°N 90.8675°W	04:13–04:36	25.25 mi (40.64 km)	1,000 yd (910 m)	This strong wedge tornado narrowly missed the Quad Cities metropolitan area to the northwest. Many power poles were snapped, a house had its roof ripped off, numerous farm buildings were damaged or destroyed, and many trees were snapped or uprooted. A small free standing tower was bent over 1/3 from the top.
EF1	WSW of Bennett to NNE of Wheatland	Cedar, Clinton	IA	41.7468°N 90.99°W	04:18–04:31	16.63 mi (26.76 km)	100 yd (91 m)	A farm suffered the most severe damage, with all of the outbuildings and most of the trees destroyed. Other outbuildings, trees, and power lines sustained damage along the tornado's path.
EF2	NW of Walcott to E of Goose Lake	Scott, Clinton	IA	41.599°N 90.7988°W	04:19–04:46	34.68 mi (55.81 km)	200 yd (180 m)	A house had its roof blown off, another home sustained minor damage, outbuildings were damaged or destroyed, trees were snapped and uprooted, and several power poles were snapped as a result of this long-tracked tornado. Minor tree and structure damage occurred in the town of DeWitt.
EF1	S of Macks Creek	Camden	MO	37.9624°N 92.994°W	04:24–04:25	2 mi (3.2 km)	440 yd (400 m)	A mobile home, outbuildings, and trees were damaged. One person was injured.
EF0	S of Rocky Mount	Morgan	MO	38.2468°N 92.7159°W	04:36–04:37	0.33 mi (0.53 km)	50 yd (46 m)	Outbuildings and docks were damaged.
EF0	S of Low Moor	Clinton	IA	41.7503°N 90.3847°W	04:40–04:45	4.36 mi (7.02 km)	50 yd (46 m)	Trees and outbuildings were damaged. One home lost a part of its roof.
EF1	W of Combs	Washington, Madison	AR	35.8074°N 93.9938°W	04:51–05:02	6.4 mi (10.3 km)	400 yd (370 m)	Trees were snapped and uprooted. Chicken houses and a home were damaged.
EF1	NW of Erie	Whiteside	IL	41.7165°N 90.1358°W	04:53–05:01	1.54 mi (2.48 km)	10 yd (9.1 m)	This narrow tornado snapped trees and damaged or destroyed outbuildings along its path.
EF1	NW of Argyle to NE of Freeburg	Osage	MO	38.3007°N 92.0355°W	05:03–05:11	7.26 mi (11.68 km)	75 yd (69 m)	A hay barn was destroyed, and trees were snapped and uprooted.
EF1	Rhineland to SSE of Warrenton	Montgomery, Warren	MO	38.7166°N 91.5152°W	05:17–05:38	20.87 mi (33.59 km)	150 yd (140 m)	The roof of a building and fences on the grounds of a baseball field in Rhineland were damaged. Further along the path, varying amounts of damage was inflicted to several homesteads, farm buildings, and residences. Numerous trees were snapped and uprooted, and barns and garages were destroyed. A building at a private campground sustained roof damage as well.
EF2	N of Mossville to ENE of Saint Joe	Newton, Searcy	AR	35.9252°N 93.3880°W	05:38–06:27	36.64 mi (58.97 km)	700 yd (640 m)	This strong, long-tracked tornado struck the town of Parthenon and heavily damaged several homes, destroyed outbuildings, and ripped the roof off of a church building. The town's post office; which was housed a single-wide trailer structure, was completely swept away and destroyed. Further along the path to the north of Vendor, a house was destroyed. Near Saint Joe, a house sustained significant damage, a manufactured home was completely destroyed, and outbuildings were damaged. Many trees and power lines were downed along the path. One person was injured.
EF1	Wentzville	St. Charles	MO	38.8051°N 90.9085°W	05:51–05:54	3.15 mi (5.07 km)	100 yd (91 m)	A tornado began west of Wentzville and tracked through downtown, causing mainly minor damage to many homes and businesses. However, one building sustained significant damage to its roof while a second large building at a lumber business was destroyed. Many mobile homes were damaged at a mobile home park, one of which was flipped over. Trees were snapped and uprooted, a large camper trailer was overturned, and several road signs were flattened. Three people were injured at the mobile home park.
EF1	N of Easton	Mason	IL	40.2633°N 89.8563°W	05:52–05:57	6.76 mi (10.88 km)	150 yd (140 m)	A machine shed was severely damaged, with most of its roof removed and a northern wall bowed out. A home under construction had part of its eastern wall blown out. Power poles were snapped, irrigation rigs were overturned, a grain silo had half of its peaked roof caved in, and part of a second machine shed had smaller wall pieces ripped off. A farmstead was damaged as well.

=== March 7 event ===
List of confirmed tornadoes – Tuesday, March 7, 2017
EF#	Location	County / Parish	State	Start Coord.	Time (UTC)	Path length	Max width	Summary
EF1	NW of San Jose	Tazewell	IL	40.3459°N 89.6934°W	06:00–06:06	7.38 mi (11.88 km)	150 yd (140 m)	Numerous trees were snapped or uprooted, and numerous outbuildings or barns were severely damaged.
EF2	NNE of Delavan	Tazewell	IL	40.392°N 89.5381°W	06:09–06:13	2.8 mi (4.5 km)	200 yd (180 m)	Several outbuildings and grain bins were heavily damaged or destroyed, a trailer was overturned, and trees were snapped or uprooted. Debris from affected structures was scattered up to a mile away.
EF0	E of Ladd	Bureau	IL	41.382°N 89.205°W	06:14–06:15	0.29 mi (0.47 km)	25 yd (23 m)	A trained storm spotter reported a brief tornado in a field.
EF0	S of Dittmer	Jefferson	MO	38.3116°N 90.7115°W	06:29–06:32	2.63 mi (4.23 km)	80 yd (73 m)	Several trees were snapped, uprooted, and twisted. Several homes sustained minor roof and siding damage.
EF0	Hillsboro	Jefferson	MO	38.2424°N 90.5707°W	06:39–06:41	1.14 mi (1.83 km)	75 yd (69 m)	Bleachers, hurdles, and other school equipment were destroyed and blown up to 300 yd (270 m) at Hillsboro High School. Several buildings, including barns and outbuildings, at the Jefferson County Fairgrounds sustained major roof failure, with debris tossed up to 200 yd (180 m). The roofs to a social services building and a number of homes sustained damage. Trees were toppled.
EF1	Sawyerville to SE of Litchfield	Macoupin, Montgomery	IL	39.0745°N 89.815°W	06:50–07:03	12.92 mi (20.79 km)	100 yd (91 m)	One garage in Sawyerville was destroyed, damaging two cars inside. Homes in town sustained minor damage, an RV camper was rolled, and trees and power poles were downed. Some falling trees landed on homes in Sawyerville. Outside of town, the tornado continued to the northeast and caused additional minor damage to trees, homes, and outbuildings before dissipating. One person was injured.
EF1	E of Irving to E of Witt	Montgomery	IL	39.2061°N 89.3969°W	07:14–07:19	7.17 mi (11.54 km)	100 yd (91 m)	Farm outbuildings had portions of their metal covering ripped off, trees were snapped, and empty grain bins were tossed 100–200 yd (91–183 m). One home had its chimney blown off, and a barn was slid partially off its foundation.
EF0	N of Black Rock	Lawrence	AR	36.1184°N 91.1020°W	08:37–08:38	0.35 mi (0.56 km)	100 yd (91 m)	Some farm buildings sustained damage to their metal roofs. Trees were damaged as well.

=== March 9 event ===
List of confirmed tornadoes – Thursday, March 9, 2017
EF#	Location	County / Parish	State	Start Coord.	Time (UTC)	Path length	Max width
EF2	NNE of Doniphan	Ripley	MO	36.717°N 90.804°W	00:25–00:44	9.64 mi (15.51 km)	600 yd (550 m)
EF2	Thousands of trees were snapped and uprooted, with some snapped near the base of the tree, and a barn was destroyed.						
EF1	NNW of Poplar Bluff	Butler	MO	36.8917°N 90.5408°W	00:32–00:44	6.35 mi (10.22 km)	100 yd (91 m)
EF1	Tornado touched down in the Mark Twain National Forest and snapped or uprooted many trees.						
EF0	NE of Butterfield	Barry	MO	36.766°N 93.8717°W	00:42–00:43	0.1 mi (0.16 km)	100 yd (91 m)
EF0	A home sustained minor damage.						
EF0	E of Reeds Spring	Taney	MO	36.74°N 93.3°W	00:50–00:51	0.1 mi (0.16 km)	75 yd (69 m)
EF0	A wooden-framed structure was destroyed and three homes sustained minor roof damage.						
EF0	SW of Jenkins	Barry	MO	36.7056°N 93.7501°W	01:00–01:01	0.1 mi (0.16 km)	100 yd (91 m)
EF0	Multiple trees were snapped and uprooted.						
EF1	NW of Dudley	Stoddard	MO	36.8531°N 90.2082°W	01:03–01:07	2.28 mi (3.67 km)	75 yd (69 m)
EF1	A residence lost its windows and doors while also sustaining minor roof damage. A nearby large barn lost a wall and a portion of its metal roof. A second home lost a few shingles, outbuildings were damaged, and trees were downed. One fallen tree caused extensive damage to a garage. A gazebo was blown 100 yd (91 m) into a field.						
EF0	SE of Forsyth	Taney	MO	36.687°N 93.1218°W	01:06–01:07	1.9 mi (3.1 km)	100 yd (91 m)
EF0	A strip mall roof was damaged, and trees were uprooted.						
EF1	S of Broseley	Butler	MO	36.6611°N 90.2736°W	01:14–01:18	2.73 mi (4.39 km)	200 yd (180 m)
EF1	A farm machine was leveled and other small structures were damaged or destroyed as well. Large irrigation piping was thrown hundreds of feet, farm implements were overturned, and two camper units were rolled. At least four houses received minor to moderate damage to their roofs, windows, and siding, while numerous trees were uprooted.						
EF1	Bernie	Stoddard	MO	36.6614°N 90.0897°W	01:28–01:48	11.17 mi (17.98 km)	250 yd (230 m)
EF1	Farm machine sheds of various sizes were leveled. Several homes in Bernie received damage ranging from shingle loss to blown out windows and walls. A small camper unit was overturned, and numerous trees were snapped or uprooted.						
EF0	NE of Parma	Stoddard	MO	36.6715°N 89.7598°W	02:00–02:02	0.73 mi (1.17 km)	100 yd (91 m)
EF0	Several trees and tree limbs were downed, while two grain bins were pushed in on one side.						
EF1	NW of New Madrid	New Madrid	MO	36.671°N 89.6209°W	02:10–02:12	1.14 mi (1.83 km)	150 yd (140 m)
EF1	A house had its roof partially ripped off, a small section of fencing was downed, underpinning was tossed from a mobile home, and several trees were uprooted.						
EF2	ENE of New Madrid to SW of Hickman	New Madrid, Fulton	MO, KY	36.6169°N 89.3918°W	02:26–02:38	9.66 mi (15.55 km)	250 yd (230 m)
EF2	A few farm sheds and several grain bins were destroyed, irrigation pivots were blown over, and extensive tree damage occurred. Power poles and power lines were toppled.						
EF2	Hickman to N of Union	Fulton, Obion	KY, TN	36.569°N 89.1867°W	02:41–02:54	10.17 mi (16.37 km)	250 yd (230 m)
EF2	More than 45 structures were damaged or destroyed, with considerable damage occurring in Hickman at the beginning of the path. Numerous power poles were broken, and numerous trees were snapped or uprooted. A frame house had its entire roof structure ripped off.						
EF1	Southern Murray	Calloway	KY	36.5996°N 88.3322°W	03:13–03:19	5.61 mi (9.03 km)	150 yd (140 m)
EF1	Two dugouts had their roofs torn off and hurled across the street at the local high school, a well-built steel barn was damaged, and many trees were snapped or uprooted along the path. A building was destroyed by falling trees as well.						
EF0	N of Clarksburg	Carroll	TN	35.9077°N 88.3921°W	03:54–03:56	0.96 mi (1.54 km)	150 yd (140 m)
EF0	Trees and storage buildings were damaged.						
EF0	SE of Belfast	Marshall	TN	35.4146°N 86.7049°W	05:32–05:36	3.15 mi (5.07 km)	100 yd (91 m)
EF0	The roofs of a few houses were damaged, several outbuildings were destroyed, and several trees were snapped.						
EF1	ESE of Lynchburg	Moore, Franklin	TN	35.30°N 86.28°W	05:55–06:08	4.2 mi (6.8 km)	320 yd (290 m)
EF1	A mobile home, as well as a chicken house undergoing reparation, were both destroyed. Significant tree damage was observed.						

=== March 11 event ===
List of confirmed tornadoes – Saturday, March 11, 2017
EF#	Location	County / Parish	State	Start Coord.	Time (UTC)	Path length	Max width
EF0	W of Beaumont	Jefferson	TX	30.0929°N 94.2291°W	20:47–20:48	0.45 mi (0.72 km)	10 yd (9.1 m)
EF0	Broadcast media relayed video of a tornado tracking across an open field.						

=== March 13 event ===
List of confirmed tornadoes – Monday, March 13, 2017
EF#	Location	County / Parish	State	Start Coord.	Time (UTC)	Path length	Max width
EF1	NNE of Cleveland	Charlotte	FL	27.0021°N 81.9690°W	00:03–00:04	0.18 mi (0.29 km)	100 yd (91 m)
EF1	Several trees were snapped above the base or uprooted, a pickup truck was flipped, a trailer was lofted into a tree, and a poorly constructed outbuilding sustained moderate damage.						
EF1	SSW of Englewood	Charlotte	FL	26.9339°N 82.3670°W	01:15–01:16	0.13 mi (0.21 km)	75 yd (69 m)
EF1	A waterspout moved ashore, inflicting moderate roof damage to a multifamily condo building and removing a majority of the roof off an older home. A two-story residence also had a large portion of shingles and siding ripped off. A few trees were snapped or uprooted.						

=== March 14 event ===
List of confirmed tornadoes – Tuesday, March 14, 2017
EF#	Location	County / Parish	State	Start Coord.	Time (UTC)	Path length	Max width
EF0	WNW of Cooper City	Broward	FL	26.1277°N 80.2978°W	05:23–05:27	1.27 mi (2.04 km)	50 yd (46 m)
EF0	Survey crews confirmed a tornado caused a discontinuous track of tree damage through Broward County.						

=== March 19 event ===
List of confirmed tornadoes – Sunday, March 19, 2017
EF#	Location	County / Parish	State	Start Coord.	Time (UTC)	Path length	Max width
EF0	N of Alpine	Brewster	TX	30.3874°N 103.6677°W	21:19–21:21	0.21 mi (0.34 km)	50 yd (46 m)
EF0	The public reported a landspout tornado.						

=== March 21 event ===
List of confirmed tornadoes – Tuesday, March 21, 2017
EF#	Location	County / Parish	State	Start Coord.	Time (UTC)	Path length	Max width
EF0	SE of Winder	Barrow	GA	33.9807°N 83.6548°W	01:03–01:04	0.14 mi (0.23 km)	100 yd (91 m)
EF0	Most of a barn was destroyed, with debris carried 0.25 mi (0.40 km). Several large trees were snapped or uprooted.						
EF1	ESE of Arcade	Jackson	GA	34.0580°N 83.4923°W	01:03–01:04	0.44 mi (0.71 km)	100 yd (91 m)
EF1	A house under construction was lifted, with its moorings ripped from the ground. At least a dozen large trees were snapped, and a residence sustained minor damage.						

=== March 23 event ===
List of confirmed tornadoes – Thursday, March 23, 2017
EF#	Location	County / Parish	State	Start Coord.	Time (UTC)	Path length	Max width
EF1	SW of Vero Beach	St. Lucie	FL	27.522°N 80.5496°W	17:40–17:42	0.96 mi (1.54 km)	30 yd (27 m)
EF1	A power pole was snapped.						

=== March 24 event ===
List of confirmed tornadoes – Friday, March 24, 2017
EF#	Location	County / Parish	State	Start Coord.	Time (UTC)	Path length	Max width
EF0	Orchards	Clark	WA	45.6723°N 122.5651°W	22:10–22:20	2.3 mi (3.7 km)	15 yd (14 m)
EF0	Weak tornado briefly touched down in Orchards, causing minor damage to trees, fences, and patio furniture.						
EF2	WSW of Marshall	Harrison	TX	32.4825°N 94.4499°W	01:31–01:36	2.71 mi (4.36 km)	225 yd (206 m)
EF2	This low-end EF2 tornado snapped and uprooted many trees, completely destroyed a metal outbuilding, damaged carports, and ripped roofing material off of several homes.						
EF0	SSE of Fountain Lake	Garland	AR	34.5259°N 92.9650°W	02:58–03:00	0.25 mi (0.40 km)	150 yd (140 m)
EF0	A number of trees were fallen or damaged.						
EF1	SSE of Stanley	DeSoto	LA	31.8527°N 93.8726°W	03:05–03:15	2.07 mi (3.33 km)	220 yd (200 m)
EF1	A waterspout moved ashore, lifting three boats out of the water, including two that were tossed 250–300 yd (230–270 m) and one that was deposited on a house's back porch. Several homes sustained minor damage to their roofs, siding, and porches. Several pine trees were snapped.						
EF2	SE of Lonsdale	Hot Spring, Saline	AR	34.5024°N 92.7689°W	03:31–03:33	1.22 mi (1.96 km)	150 yd (140 m)
EF2	An outbuilding and other structures sustained severe damage, a house had its roof ripped off, and trees were toppled.						
EF1	ESE of Lonsdale	Saline	AR	34.5279°N 92.7723°W	03:33–03:36	1.85 mi (2.98 km)	200 yd (180 m)
EF1	Many trees were snapped or downed, several outbuildings or barns were severely damaged or destroyed, and a carport was lofted.						
EF1	E of Mansfield	DeSoto	LA	32.0248°N 93.6846°W	03:35–03:38	1.46 mi (2.35 km)	110 yd (100 m)
EF1	Pine trees were snapped, including some that fell on two homes. Four outbuildings were damaged or destroyed by fallen trees.						
EF1	Hagewood to NW of Natchitoches	Natchitoches	LA	31.7063°N 93.2166°W	04:00–04:09	8.51 mi (13.70 km)	2,464 yd (2,253 m)
EF1	Large wedge tornado. A metal warehouse lost some siding, a pool supply business sustained roof damage, and an I-beam structure behind the pool business had several I-beams toppled (including one attached to a concrete base). Several homes sustained minor roof damage, and several outbuildings were damaged or destroyed. Trees were snapped as well.						
EF2	N of Gibson	Pulaski, Faulkner	AR	34.9262°N 92.2479°W	04:20–04:27	4.31 mi (6.94 km)	100 yd (91 m)
EF2	This tornado destroyed four mobile homes and damaged several others.						
EF1	NW of Dodson	Winn	LA	32.1278°N 92.7470°W	04:49–04:50	1.23 mi (1.98 km)	350 yd (320 m)
EF1	Several trees were snapped.						
EF1	E of Jonesboro	Jackson	LA	32.1681°N 92.6882°W	04:54–05:04	6.9 mi (11.1 km)	100 yd (91 m)
EF1	Several trees were snapped, and a metal outbuilding was overturned.						

=== March 25 event ===
List of confirmed tornadoes – Saturday, March 25, 2017
EF#	Location	County / Parish	State	Start Coord.	Time (UTC)	Path length	Max width
EF0	E of Baytown	Harris	TX	29.7829°N 94.8774°W	05:23	0.01 mi (0.016 km)	30 yd (27 m)
EF0	A mobile home was moved, an adjacent house lost some shingles, and trees were damaged. A large mattress was lofted into the air.						
EF0	Marmaduke	Greene	AR	36.1834°N 90.3852°W	06:34–06:35	0.78 mi (1.26 km)	120 yd (110 m)
EF0	Approximately 20 homes sustained roof damage in town, trees were snapped, and a gas station convenience store had its metal awning ripped off. An industrial plant had its roof and several roll-up doors damaged as well.						
EF0	N of Perry	Ralls	MO	39.4448°N 91.6656°W	23:21–23:48	6.76 mi (10.88 km)	20 yd (18 m)
EF0	A local storm chaser reported a tornado that touched down multiple times. No damage was found.						

=== March 26 event ===
List of confirmed tornadoes – Sunday, March 26, 2017
EF#	Location	County / Parish	State	Start Coord.	Time (UTC)	Path length	Max width
EF1	S of Williamsburg	Clermont	OH	39.0139°N 84.0608°W	18:24–18:25	0.31 mi (0.50 km)	70 yd (64 m)
EF1	A small barn and camper were overturned. A residence sustained structural damage, with its garage door walls collapsed and the roof blown off.						
EF0	Sabana Llana Sur	Trujillo Alto	PR	18.383°N 66.0312°W	19:00–19:03	0.43 mi (0.69 km)	100 yd (91 m)
EF0	Several trees and power lines were downed, while a few homes sustained structural damage.						
EF0	ESE of Ada	Pontotoc	OK	34.739°N 96.609°W	00:14–00:25	4 mi (6.4 km)	50 yd (46 m)
EF0	Trees and outbuildings were damaged.						
EF0	E of Ada	Pontotoc	OK	34.758°N 96.534°W	00:27–00:28	0.3 mi (0.48 km)	30 yd (27 m)
EF0	Multiple trained storm spotters reported a brief tornado.						

=== March 27 event ===
List of confirmed tornadoes – Monday, March 27, 2017
EF#	Location	County / Parish	State	Start Coord.	Time (UTC)	Path length	Max width
EF0	WNW of Theo	Alcorn	MS	34.9358°N 88.7171°W	18:59–19:00	0.19 mi (0.31 km)	50 yd (46 m)
EF0	A trained storm spotter reported a brief tornado.						
EF0	S of Cerulean	Trigg, Christian	KY	36.9334°N 87.7316°W	19:27–19:33	4.4 mi (7.1 km)	125 yd (114 m)
EF0	One barn was completely destroyed while six others were damaged. A porch roof to a house was blown off, and trees had broken branches.						
EF0	S of Lexington	Henderson	TN	35.5536°N 88.3624°W	21:59–22:07	6.42 mi (10.33 km)	50 yd (46 m)
EF0	Trees were damaged.						
EF1	S of Center	Metcalfe	KY	37.137°N 85.6990°W	22:05–22:06	0.31 mi (0.50 km)	100 yd (91 m)
EF1	Two large barns and a small outbuilding were destroyed, the roof was ripped off one home, and the front porch of a nearby house was raised, detaching its supports. An automotive repair shop was shifted slightly off its foundation, with damage to the roof and two doors blown. Numerous vehicles near the shop were damaged, including the cab of a pickup that was crushed. An RV was blown into a utility pole, and several other vehicles had their windows broken.						
EF1	S of Decaturville	Decatur	TN	35.5578°N 88.1721°W	22:18–22:27	5.5 mi (8.9 km)	100 yd (91 m)
EF1	Two mobile homes were destroyed, houses sustained mainly roof damage, and trees were damaged.						
EF1	NW of Hohenwald	Perry, Lewis	TN	35.5514°N 87.6745°W	23:12–23:26	7.26 mi (11.68 km)	300 yd (270 m)
EF1	Dozens of trees were uprooted, while minor roof and outbuilding damage was observed.						

=== March 28 event ===
List of confirmed tornadoes – Tuesday, March 28, 2017
EF#	Location	County / Parish	State	Start Coord.	Time (UTC)	Path length	Max width
EFU	E of Crosbyton	Crosby	TX	33.6456°N 101.1935°W	21:26–21:34	2.47 mi (3.98 km)	100 yd (91 m)
EFU	An off-duty NWS employee observed a cone tornado.						
EFU	NE of Crosbyton	Crosby	TX	33.6893°N 101.1791°W	21:34–21:43	2.07 mi (3.33 km)	400 yd (370 m)
EFU	An off-duty NWS employee reported a large tornado.						
EF0	SSE of Royston	Fisher	TX	32.776°N 100.2873°W	21:36–21:37	0.07 mi (0.11 km)	25 yd (23 m)
EF0	A trained storm spotter reported a tornado in an open field.						
EF0	W of Tye	Taylor	TX	32.44°N 99.94°W	21:52–21:53	0.01 mi (0.016 km)	25 yd (23 m)
EF0	A meteorologist from Dyess Air Force Base reported a tornado.						
EFU	W of Spur	Dickens	TX	33.464°N 100.9993°W	22:14–22:16	1.02 mi (1.64 km)	100 yd (91 m)
EFU	A storm chaser documented a tornado.						
EFU	SSE of Dougherty	Floyd	TX	33.889°N 101.0698°W	22:17–22:18	0.61 mi (0.98 km)	30 yd (27 m)
EFU	A storm chaser observed a tornado.						
EF0	N of Hawley	Jones	TX	32.6783°N 99.8247°W	22:33–22:43	4.5 mi (7.2 km)	50 yd (46 m)
EF0	Storm chasers provided video evidence of a tornado.						
EF0	N of Wellington	Collingsworth	TX	34.89°N 100.27°W	22:57–23:01	3.1 mi (5.0 km)	50 yd (46 m)
EF0	Storm chasers reported a rain-wrapped tornado.						
EF0	ESE of Stamford	Jones	TX	32.8888°N 99.7803°W	23:03–23:10	4.68 mi (7.53 km)	100 yd (91 m)
EF0	Storm chaser video depicted a cone tornado.						
EF1	W of Guthrie	Dickens	TX	33.599°N 100.536°W	23:34–23:35	0.7 mi (1.1 km)	50 yd (46 m)
EF1	A large section of metal roofing was ripped off a well-constructed building, with many of the underlying support trusses separated. A large, twin gravity box was toppled, and trees were blown over or damaged.						
EFU	ESE of Afton	Dickens	TX	33.6482°N 100.5653°W	23:43–23:47	1.91 mi (3.07 km)	30 yd (27 m)
EFU	Storm chasers reported a tornado over open land.						
EFU	W of Guthrie	King	TX	33.6653°N 100.5135°W	23:49–23:51	1.4 mi (2.3 km)	50 yd (46 m)
EFU	Storm chasers reported a tornado over open land.						
EFU	SW of Seymour	Baylor	TX	33.417°N 99.387°W	00:13–00:18	3 mi (4.8 km)	50 yd (46 m)
EFU	Storm chasers videoed a tornado.						
EF0	E of Midkiff	Upton, Glasscock	TX	31.6318°N 101.8159°W	00:21–00:25	5.53 mi (8.90 km)	75 yd (69 m)
EF0	A tornado tracked through an open field, causing no damage.						
EF2	NE of Midkiff	Glasscock	TX	31.6706°N 101.6766°W	00:28–00:34	1.79 mi (2.88 km)	75 yd (69 m)
EF2	A small barn was damaged, two grain silos were displaced, and 32 power poles were snapped.						
EF0	NE of Midkiff	Mitchell	TX	32.0926°N 100.849°W	01:50–01:56	4.53 mi (7.29 km)	50 yd (46 m)
EF0	A weak tornado was spotted with no visible damage.						

=== March 29 event ===
List of confirmed tornadoes – Wednesday, March 29, 2017
EF#	Location	County / Parish	State	Start Coord.	Time (UTC)	Path length	Max width
EF0	Southern Haslet	Tarrant	TX	32.923°N 97.373°W	07:08–07:21	6.48 mi (10.43 km)	200 yd (180 m)
EF0	A weak tornado moved through mainly residential areas and inflicted mostly minor roof damage, though one home had a small part of its roof blown off. Trees were damaged and a few billboards were downed as well. A weather station observed a gust of 83 mph (134 km/h).						
EF0	Northern Fort Worth to Keller	Tarrant	TX	32.861°N 97.331°W	07:10–07:15	11.37 mi (18.30 km)	500 yd (460 m)
EF0	Some commercial buildings sustained superficial damage, multiple apartment complexes sustained roof damage, and large tree limbs and power poles were snapped. A large retail store had its roof significantly damaged.						
EF1	Lewisville	Denton	TX	33.035°N 97.03°W	07:31–07:34	1.62 mi (2.61 km)	130 yd (120 m)
EF1	Approximately a dozen homes were damaged in Lewisville, including three with substantial roof material and decking loss. The town's municipal center building was damaged as well.						
EF1	N of Longview	Gregg	TX	32.5278°N 94.7976°W	10:38–10:49	5.97 mi (9.61 km)	480 yd (440 m)
EF1	Trees were snapped and uprooted, with some landing on and causing damage to two residences. Two cars were crushed by falling trees as well. Several other homes sustained roof damage, fences were flattened, and the cross at the Grace Crossing United Methodist Church was significantly bent. A light pole was also bent, and the roof was partially lifted at the Judson Road Animal Clinic.						
EF0	Southwestern Houston	Harris	TX	29.6984°N 95.4873°W	15:34–15:37	0.27 mi (0.43 km)	50 yd (46 m)
EF0	This brief tornado caused roof and window damage to some apartment buildings, destroyed large carports, and caused tree damage as well.						
EF0	SW of Cleveland	Liberty	TX	30.266°N 95.1294°W	18:23–18:25	0.1 mi (0.16 km)	20 yd (18 m)
EF0	Large trees were downed.						
EF1	Southeastern Pasadena	Harris	TX	29.6487°N 95.071°W	19:55–19:58	0.43 mi (0.69 km)	50 yd (46 m)
EF1	This tornado impacted the southeastern fringes of Pasadena, just to the south of La Porte Municipal Airport. Metal industrial buildings were damaged and cars were stacked or pushed into and on top of each other in a parking lot. A large semi-trailer was slid into several vehicles, and a large storage facility sustained significant roof damage. A metal light pole was bent to the ground as well.						
EF0	La Porte	Harris	TX	29.633°N 95.0278°W	20:00–20:03	2 mi (3.2 km)	200 yd (180 m)
EF0	Damage to trees and power lines was observed in town, and a small metal garden shed was lofted over a house into a tree.						
EF1	Morgan's Point	Harris	TX	29.6814°N 95.0285°W	20:03–20:06	2.67 mi (4.30 km)	250 yd (230 m)
EF1	Large steel storage tanks were bent inward, and many large metal shipping containers were toppled. Trees were snapped, and a metal industrial building had its roof peeled off.						
EF1	S of Ivanhoe	Tyler	TX	30.6708°N 94.4198°W	20:13–20:18	1.31 mi (2.11 km)	600 yd (550 m)
EF1	Multiple trees were downed, including some that landed on a home and an SUV. Several homes sustained minor damage to their siding.						
EF1	ENE of Hillister	Tyler	TX	30.6747°N 94.3590°W	20:25–20:27	0.46 mi (0.74 km)	300 yd (270 m)
EF1	Multiple trees were blown down by this weak tornado.						
EF0	NNE of Beach City	Chambers	TX	29.7716°N 94.8364°W	20:35–20:36	0.08 mi (0.13 km)	30 yd (27 m)
EF0	This brief tornado caused minor tree damage.						
EF1	SSE of Jasper	Jasper	TX	30.8309°N 93.9739°W	21:12–21:13	0.42 mi (0.68 km)	25 yd (23 m)
EF1	Several trees were snapped or downed in Zion Hill as a result of this brief tornado.						
EF1	W of Burkeville	Newton	TX	30.9534°N 93.8457°W	21:34–21:58	12.19 mi (19.62 km)	800 yd (730 m)
EF1	Numerous large trees were snapped or uprooted, with at least two houses that were impacted by fallen trees. A mobile home lost its roof as well.						
EF1	NW of Scottsville	Pope	AR	35.5487°N 93.0177°W	00:23–00:27	2.4 mi (3.9 km)	150 yd (140 m)
EF1	Tree damage was noted in rural Pope County.						
EF2	Oakdale	Allen	LA	30.7928°N 92.6769°W	01:11–01:22	3.57 mi (5.75 km)	100 yd (91 m)
EF2	A gas station canopy was damaged. Numerous large trees were snapped or downed, some of which impacted homes and businesses in town. Some structures received roof damage as well. The Immigration Office of the Federal Department of Homeland Security had a large section of its metal roof removed.						
EF1	NE of Salem	Dent	MO	37.7304°N 91.443°W	04:00–04:02	2.5 mi (4.0 km)	200 yd (180 m)
EF1	A barn was moved off of its foundation, one home had its roof destroyed while several others had their roofs damaged, and numerous trees were snapped or uprooted.						
EF1	NE of Woodville	Wilkinson	MS	31.1774°N 91.3105°W	04:23–04:27	2.1 mi (3.4 km)	450 yd (410 m)
EF1	Numerous trees were snapped or uprooted, five homes were damaged, a commercial building had its roll-up doors blown in and a wall heavily damaged, and a recreational vehicle was blown onto its side.						

=== March 30 event ===
List of confirmed tornadoes – Thursday, March 30, 2017
EF#	Location	County / Parish	State	Start Coord.	Time (UTC)	Path length	Max width
EF0	W of Purvis	Lamar	MS	31.146°N 89.5971°W	10:32–10:34	1.06 mi (1.71 km)	200 yd (180 m)
EF0	A barn was destroyed, metal roofs were ripped from three sheds and a mobile home, and tree limbs were broken.						
EF0	Southwestern Monroe	Snohomish	WA	47.85°N 122.0°W	17:30	—N/a	—N/a
EF0	Two recreational vehicles were overturned, one of which crushed a compact car. Tree branches were downed, backyard patio furniture was tossed across a fence line, fencing was flattened, and a home sustained minor shingle damage.						

=== March 31 event ===
List of confirmed tornadoes – Friday, March 31, 2017
EF#	Location	County / Parish	State	Start Coord.	Time (UTC)	Path length	Max width
EF1	SSE of Suffolk to Southwestern Chesapeake	City of Suffolk, City of Chesapeake	VA	36.6826°N 76.5701°W	21:33–21:57	12.32 mi (19.83 km)	100 yd (91 m)
EF1	A number of trees were downed or snapped, an outbuilding was destroyed, and a home adjacent to the outbuilding was damaged by flying debris. The tornado then entered the Great Dismal Swamp and was no longer visible, however, based on radar data, it continued across the swamp and caused minor damage in Chesapeake before dissipating.						
EF2	Chesapeake to Virginia Beach	City of Chespeake, City of Virginia Beach	VA	36.74°N 76.23°W	22:13–22:28	8.86 mi (14.26 km)	350 yd (320 m)
EF2	A strong tornado moved through densely populated areas of Chesapeake and Virginia Beach, causing significant damage. Numerous homes were damaged along the path, some of which had large sections of roofs and exterior walls ripped off. A mobile home used as a work building was swept away and destroyed, and a metal industrial building was heavily damaged. A large church was partially destroyed, and many large trees were snapped and uprooted, some of which landed on structures and vehicles. The club house and press box were destroyed at the Landstown High School ball field, and several sets of bleachers were thrown over 200 yards away.						
EF1	SE of Powellsville	Bertie	NC	36.2081°N 76.9334°W	22:15–22:24	4.8 mi (7.7 km)	100 yd (91 m)
EF1	Numerous trees were snapped or uprooted. One mobile home was overturned and destroyed while a second was damaged. Some farm buildings were damaged as well.						

== See also ==
- Tornadoes of 2017
- List of United States tornadoes from September to December 2016
- List of United States tornadoes in April 2017
