= Amanda Davied =

American basketball coach and player

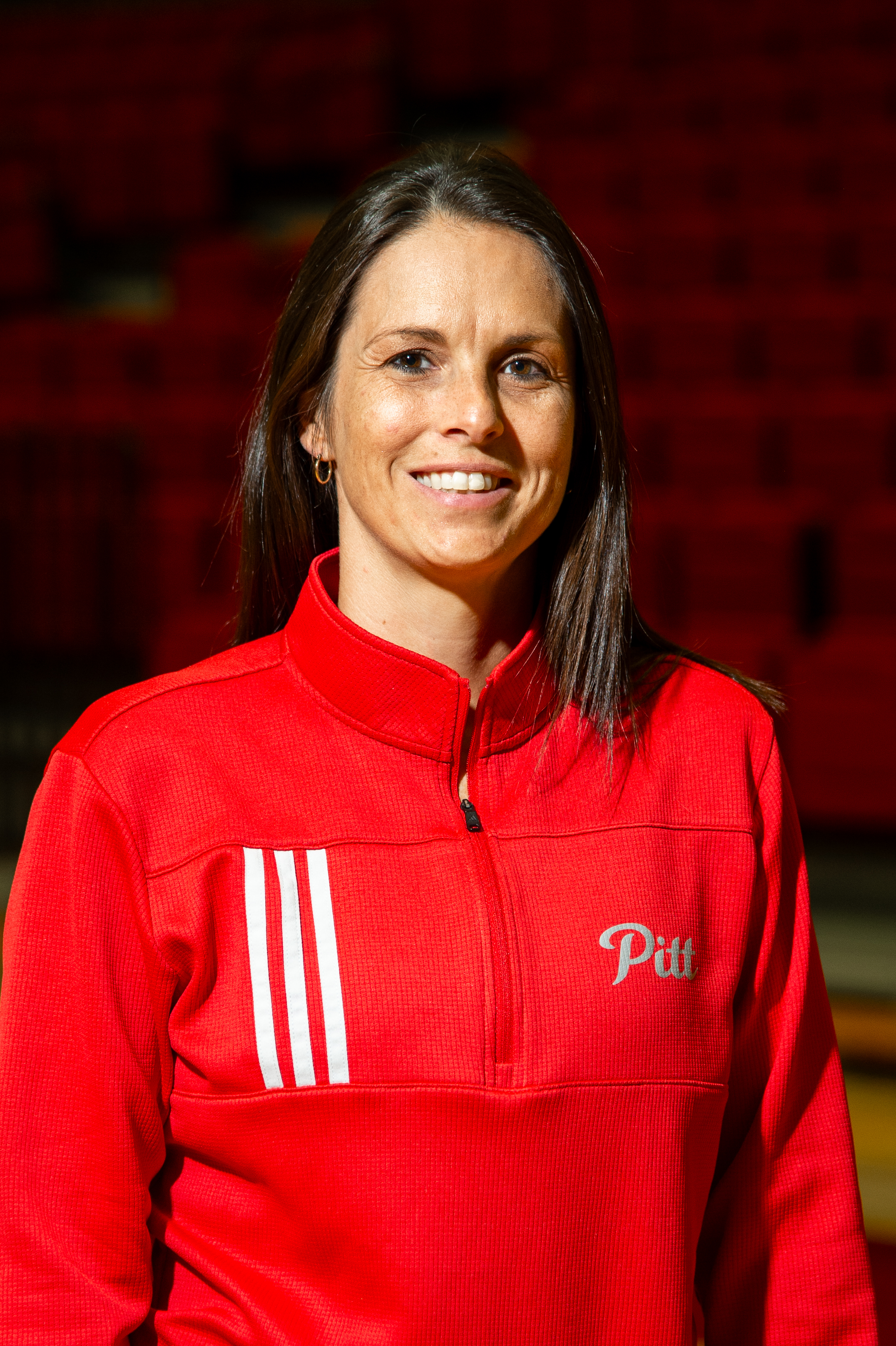
- Davied in 2023

Current position
- Title: Head coach
- Team: Pittsburg State
- Conference: The MIAA
- Record: 148–62 (.705)

Biographical details
- Born: March 18, 1981 (age 44); Farlington, Kansas

Playing career
- 1999–2003: Pittsburg State
- Position: Point guard

Coaching career (HC unless noted)
- 2003–2004: Pittsburg State (graduate asst.)
- 2004–2018: Pittsburg State (assistant)
- 2018–present: Pittsburg State

Head coaching record
- Overall: 148–62 (.705)

Amanda Davied (born March 18, 1981) is the head women's basketball coach and former player at Pittsburg State University. Prior to becoming head coach in May 2018, Davied was an assistant coach for the Pittsburg State women's basketball team since her graduation in December 2003.

== Career ==
=== Early career ===
Davied, a Farlington, Kansas, native, began her coaching career as a graduate assistant for her alma mater following her playing career in 2003. During her time as a player, Davied scored nearly 1300 points in four years, landing her in ninth place for scoring in Pittsburg State history. She holds several other records in the program.

=== Pittsburg State University ===
In 2003, Davied served as a graduate assistant before being promoted to a full-time assistant at the end of the season. During her time as an assistant coach, Davied helped lead the Gorillas to one regular season conference championship, five trips to the NCAA Tournament, and was the primary recruiting coordinator for the program.

On May 21, 2018, Davied was named the sixth head coacher Pittsburg State, after Lane Lord left for Texas–Rio Grande Valley.

== Head coach record ==
Statistics overview
Season	Team	Overall	Conference	Standing	Postseason
Pittsburg State Gorillas (Mid-America Intercollegiate Athletics Association) (2018–present)
2018–19	Pittsburg State	21–9	13–6	T–5th	NCAA Central Regional Tournament
2019–20	Pittsburg State	17–11	13–6	T–4th	
2020–21	Pittsburg State	14–9	14–8	T–5th	
2021–22	Pittsburg State	16–13	11–11	T–8th	
2022–23	Pittsburg State	23–8	17–5	4th	NCAA Central Regional Tournament
2023–24	Pittsburg State	24–8	15–7	T–5th	NCAA Central Regional Tournament
2024–25	Pittsburg State	33–4	18–1	1st	NCAA Final Four
Pittsburg State:		148–62 (.705)	101–44 (.697)		
Total:		148–62 (.705)			
National champion Postseason invitational champion Conference regular season champion Conference regular season and conference tournament champion Division regular season champion Division regular season and conference tournament champion Conference tournament champion
