= Sunset Village, Georgia =

- Unincorporated community Census-designated place
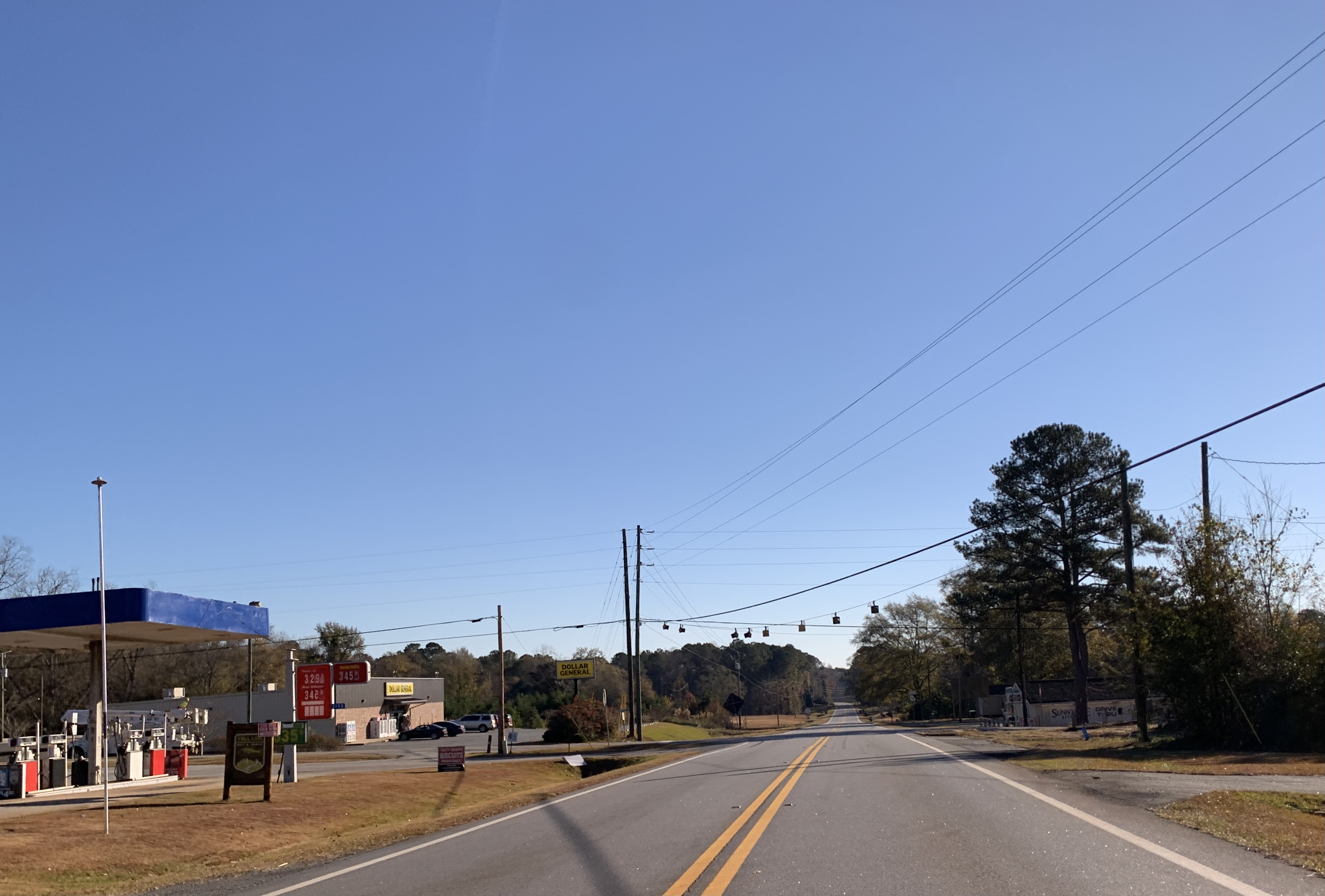

- Location in Upson County and the state of Georgia
- Coordinates: 32°53′57″N 84°24′34″W
- Country: United States
- State: Georgia
- County: Upson

Area
  - Total: 4.90 sq mi (12.68 km^{2})
  - Land: 4.80 sq mi (12.44 km^{2})
  - Water: 0.097 sq mi (0.25 km^{2})
- Elevation: 764 ft (233 m)

Population (2020)
  - Total: 921
  - Density: 191.8/sq mi (74.06/km^{2})
- Time zone: UTC-5 (Eastern (EST))
  - Summer (DST): UTC-4 (EDT)
- ZIP code: 30286
- Area code: 706
- FIPS code: 13-74768
- GNIS feature ID: 0323779

Sunset Village is an unincorporated community and census-designated place (CDP) in Upson County, Georgia, United States. As of the 2020 census, Sunset Village had a population of 921.

== Geography ==
Sunset Village is located at 32°53′57″N 84°24′34″W (32.899173, -84.409413).

According to the United States Census Bureau, the CDP has a total area of 5.0 square miles (12.9 km^{2}), of which 4.9 square miles (12.8 km^{2}) is land and 0.1 square mile (0.1 km^{2}) (1.01%) is water.

== Demographics ==
Historical population
| Census | Pop. | Note | %± |
|---|---|---|---|
| 2000 | 871 | | — |
| 2010 | 846 | | −2.9% |
| 2020 | 921 | | 8.9% |
U.S. Decennial Census; 1850-1870 1870-1880; 1890-1910 1920-1930; 1940 1950 1960; 1970 1980 1990; 2000 2010 2020

Sunset Village first appeared as a census designated place in the 2000 U.S. census.

Sunset Village, Georgia – Racial and ethnic composition Note: the U.S. census treats Hispanic/Latino as an ethnic category. This table excludes Latinos from the racial categories and assigns them to a separate category. Hispanics/Latinos may be of any race.
| Race / Ethnicity (NH = Non-Hispanic) | Pop 2000 | Pop 2010 | Pop 2020 | % 2000 | % 2010 | % 2020 |
|---|---|---|---|---|---|---|
| White alone (NH) | 841 | 796 | 825 | 96.56% | 94.09% | 89.58% |
| Black or African American alone (NH) | 22 | 26 | 50 | 2.53% | 3.07% | 5.43% |
| Native American or Alaska Native alone (NH) | 2 | 4 | 1 | 0.23% | 0.47% | 0.11% |
| Asian alone (NH) | 0 | 0 | 0 | 0.00% | 0.00% | 0.00% |
| Pacific Islander alone (NH) | 0 | 0 | 0 | 0.00% | 0.00% | 0.00% |
| Other race alone (NH) | 0 | 1 | 1 | 0.00% | 0.12% | 0.11% |
| Mixed race or Multiracial (NH) | 2 | 10 | 24 | 0.23% | 1.18% | 2.61% |
| Hispanic or Latino (any race) | 4 | 9 | 20 | 0.46% | 1.06% | 2.17% |
| Total | 871 | 846 | 921 | 100.00% | 100.00% | 100.00% |

As of the census of 2000, there were 871 people, 341 households, and 257 families residing in the CDP. The population density was 176.8 inhabitants per square mile (68.3/km^{2}). There were 358 housing units at an average density of 72.7 per square mile (28.1/km^{2}). The racial makeup of the CDP was 97.01% White, 2.53% African American, 0.23% Native American, and 0.23% from two or more races. Hispanic or Latino of any race were 0.46% of the population.

There were 341 households, out of which 34.0% had children under the age of 18 living with them, 61.3% were married couples living together, 9.4% had a female householder with no husband present, and 24.6% were non-families. 20.8% of all households were made up of individuals, and 7.6% had someone living alone who was 65 years of age or older. The average household size was 2.55 and the average family size was 2.96.

In the CDP, the population was spread out, with 26.9% under the age of 18, 6.1% from 18 to 24, 30.1% from 25 to 44, 24.7% from 45 to 64, and 12.3% who were 65 years of age or older. The median age was 36 years. For every 100 females, there were 91.4 males. For every 100 females age 18 and over, there were 86.8 males.

The median income for a household in the CDP was $34,487, and the median income for a family was $40,962. Males had a median income of $30,647 versus $21,850 for females. The per capita income for the CDP was $16,013. About 6.1% of families and 9.1% of the population were below the poverty line, including 11.4% of those under age 18 and none of those age 65 or over.
