= Farlington, Kansas =

Unincorporated community in Crawford County, Kansas

- CDP
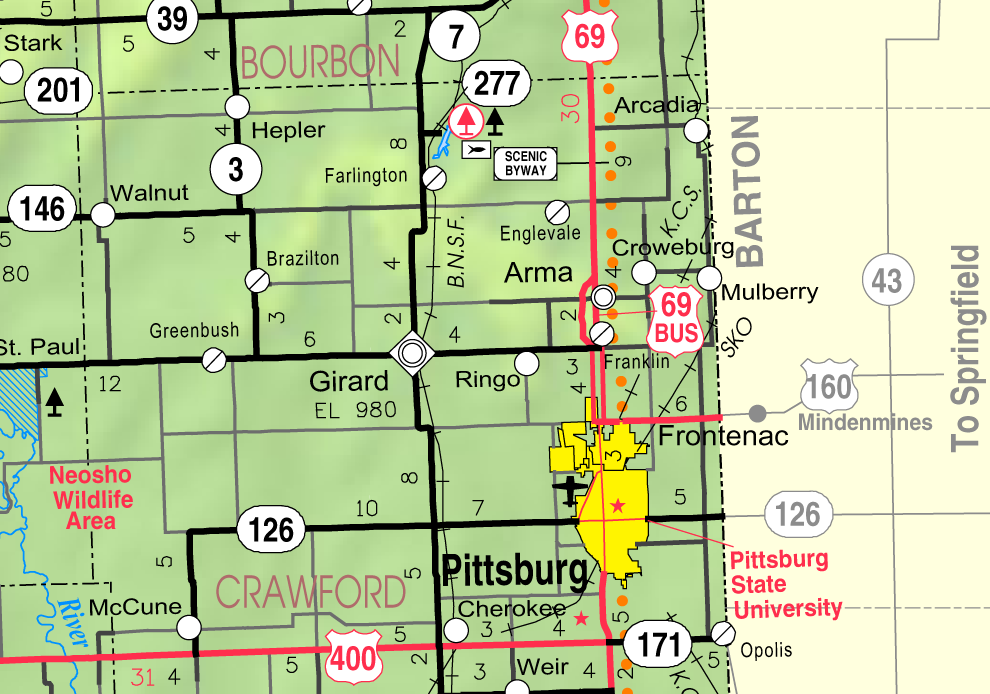
- KDOT map of Crawford County (legend)

- Location within Kansas Location within the United States
- Coordinates: 37°37′04″N 94°49′21″W
- Country: United States
- State: Kansas
- County: Crawford
- Founded: 1869
- Platted: 1869
- Elevation: 1,004 ft (306 m)

Population (2020)
  - Total: 68
- Time zone: UTC-6 (CST)
  - Summer (DST): UTC-5 (CDT)
- ZIP Code: 66734
- Area code: 620
- FIPS code: 20-23050
- GNIS ID: 2806488

Farlington is a census-designated place (CDP) in Crawford County, Kansas, United States. As of the 2020 census, the population was 68. Farlington is located near K-7, 8 miles (13 km) north of Girard.

== History ==
The first post office in Farlington was established in July 1870.

Farlington was a shipping point on the St. Louis–San Francisco Railway, and was laid out in 1869 when that line was extended to it.

Farlington has a post office with ZIP Code 66734.

== Demographics ==
Historical population
Census	Pop.	Note	%±
2020	68		—
U.S. Decennial Census

The 2020 United States census counted 68 people, 31 households, and 16 families in Farlington. The population density was 74.1 per square mile (28.6/km^{2}). There were 36 housing units at an average density of 39.2 per square mile (15.1/km^{2}). The racial makeup was 98.53% (67) white or European American (98.53% non-Hispanic white), 0.0% (0) black or African-American, 0.0% (0) Native American or Alaska Native, 0.0% (0) Asian, 0.0% (0) Pacific Islander or Native Hawaiian, 0.0% (0) from other races, and 1.47% (1) from two or more races. Hispanic or Latino of any race was 0.0% (0) of the population.

Of the 31 households, 12.9% had children under the age of 18; 48.4% were married couples living together; 22.6% had a female householder with no spouse or partner present. 48.4% of households consisted of individuals and 29.0% had someone living alone who was 65 years of age or older. The average household size was 2.0 and the average family size was 2.0. The percent of those with a bachelor's degree or higher was estimated to be 0.0% of the population.

14.7% of the population was under the age of 18, 11.8% from 18 to 24, 14.7% from 25 to 44, 32.4% from 45 to 64, and 26.5% who were 65 years of age or older. The median age was 52.3 years. For every 100 females, there were 65.9 males. For every 100 females ages 18 and older, there were 56.8 males.
