= Thomaston-Upson County School District =

School district in Georgia (U.S. state)

Address
- 205 Civic Center Drive Thomaston, Georgia, 30286-4233; United States
- Coordinates: 32.885956°N 84.312317°W

District information
- Grades: Pre-school – 12
- Superintendent: Dr. Larry D. Derico, Ed.D.
- Accreditations: Southern Association of Colleges and Schools; Georgia Accrediting Commission

Students and staff
- Enrollment: 5,009
- Faculty: 279

Other information
- Telephone: (706) 647-9621
- Fax: (706) 646-9398
- Website: www.upson.k12.ga.us

The Thomaston-Upson County School District is a public school district in Upson County, Georgia, United States, based in Thomaston. It serves the communities of Hannahs Mill, Lincoln Park, Salem, Sunset Village, The Rock, Thomaston, and Yatesville.

The public high school is Upson-Lee High School.
