= Upson =

Upson may refer to:

- Upson (surname), including a list of people with the name
- Upson County, Georgia
- Upson-Lee High School in Georgia
- Upson, Wisconsin, an unincorporated community
