= G. A. Weaver =

American physician

G.A. Weaver Sr. was an American doctor and a member of the Georgia Assembly in Thomaston, Georgia. A 1914 history of Upson County, Georgia describes him as fiery and states he let the Radical Republicans seat William Guilford before he would declare the mandated oath. Weaver was one of the founders of the Upson Banking Trust Company in 1890.
