= Governorship of Jimmy Carter =

Political career of Jimmy Carter

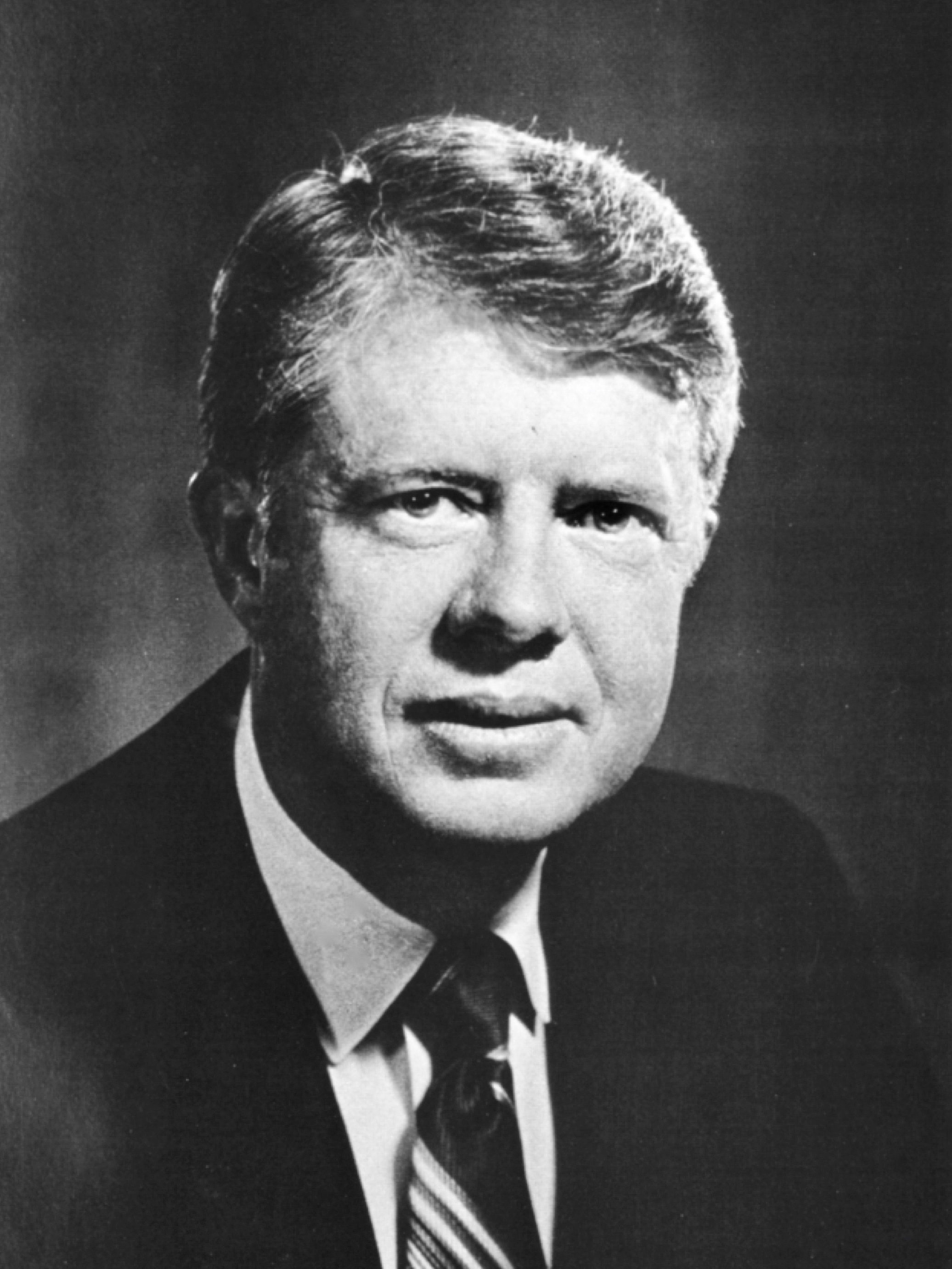
- Official portrait, 1971
- Governorship of Jimmy Carter; January 12, 1971 – January 14, 1975
- Party: Democratic
- Election: 1970
- Great Seal of the State of Georgia

Jimmy Carter served as the 76th governor of Georgia for one term between 1971 and 1975, being elected to the office in 1970. His predecessor, Lester Maddox, served as his lieutenant governor. Carter would go on to become president of the United States in 1977.

== Background ==
Jimmy Carter ran in the 1966 Georgia gubernatorial election as a Democrat, but with only 21% of the vote, he fell behind former governor Ellis Arnall and Lester Maddox in the primary. His vote share, however, was enough to force the race into a runoff, which Maddox won despite having lost the preliminary round. Carter, dismayed by his defeat to a segregationist like Maddox, fell into a deep emotional slump and retreated from politics. Thanks in large part to his sister, Ruth Carter Stapleton, he became a born again Christian. His last child, Amy, was born during this period.

=== 1970 election ===
1970 election results by county

Only a month after the 1966 election, Carter launched his campaign for governor in 1970. As Georgia at the time only allowed governors to serve one term, the Democratic field was wide open. His main opponent in the primary race was Carl Sanders, a liberal and former governor from 1963 to 1967. Originally, Carter sought to position himself as an ordinary populist who represented various demographics. To this end, he attempted to win over both black and segregationist votes. However, as the race went on, Carter's appeals to segregationists became more and more pointed, to the point where he began employing racial innuendos and distributed flyers depicting Sanders meeting black social activists and with African-American basketball players. He openly criticized Sanders for blocking Alabama governor George Wallace, the nation's leading segregationist, from speaking at the National Guard Armory. Aligning himself with Wallace, he vowed to invite him to the Georgia State Capitol, borrowed his campaign slogan "Our kind of man, our kind of governor", and began to speak in coded language, with references to "Georgia's heritage".

He pictured me as a corporate lawyer who had capitalized on being governor and who was now representing the fat cats [while] he was out there representing the average citizen [...] That’s a pretty tough thing to overcome.

— Carl Sanders

Carter received the coveted endorsements of Roy V. Harris and Maddox, both of whom celebrated his conservative turn. Harris had served as the director of George Wallace's 1968 presidential campaign in Georgia, and had also served as the leader of the notorious White Citizens Council, which Carter had refused to join earlier in his career. Despite this, he also sought and received the endorsement of Martin Luther King Sr., the father of famous civil rights activist Martin Luther King Jr., and an influential minister in his own right. Without resorting to outright racism as Maddox had done four years earlier, he had won over the most conservative voters in Georgia, which gained him the whip hand over Sanders.

After an indecisive preliminary round, Carter won the Democratic nomination runoff race with 59% of the vote. However, he felt shame for his opportunistic alignment with racism. He personally called Sanders and apologized for his conduct, and told him that he had prayed for forgiveness. Even decades after the election, Carter prevented the inclusion of information relating to his campaign in his presidential library for many years.

At the same time, Maddox won the nomination for lieutenant governor. Carter, still seeking to win over racist voters, continued to speak in coded language and made significant overtures to segregationism, calling Maddox "the essence of the Democratic Party". He faced off against Hal Suit, who had won the Republican Party nomination with 61% of the vote. Carter won the election in a landslide, receiving 620,419 votes, which amounted to nearly 60% of the popular vote. He won all but seven counties and became the 76th governor of Georgia. His victory was part of a larger sweep by the Democratic Party in the 1970 midterms, in which they won a net eleven gubernatorial races throughout the country.

== Tenure ==
Carter set about rapidly dismantling remnants of segregation in Georgia. He struggled to get along well with politicians and to work constructively with the legislature; this was an augury of his presidency. He attempted to reduce spending and improve civil rights and education. Limited by the constitution to only one term, he left office in January 1975 after four years as governor.

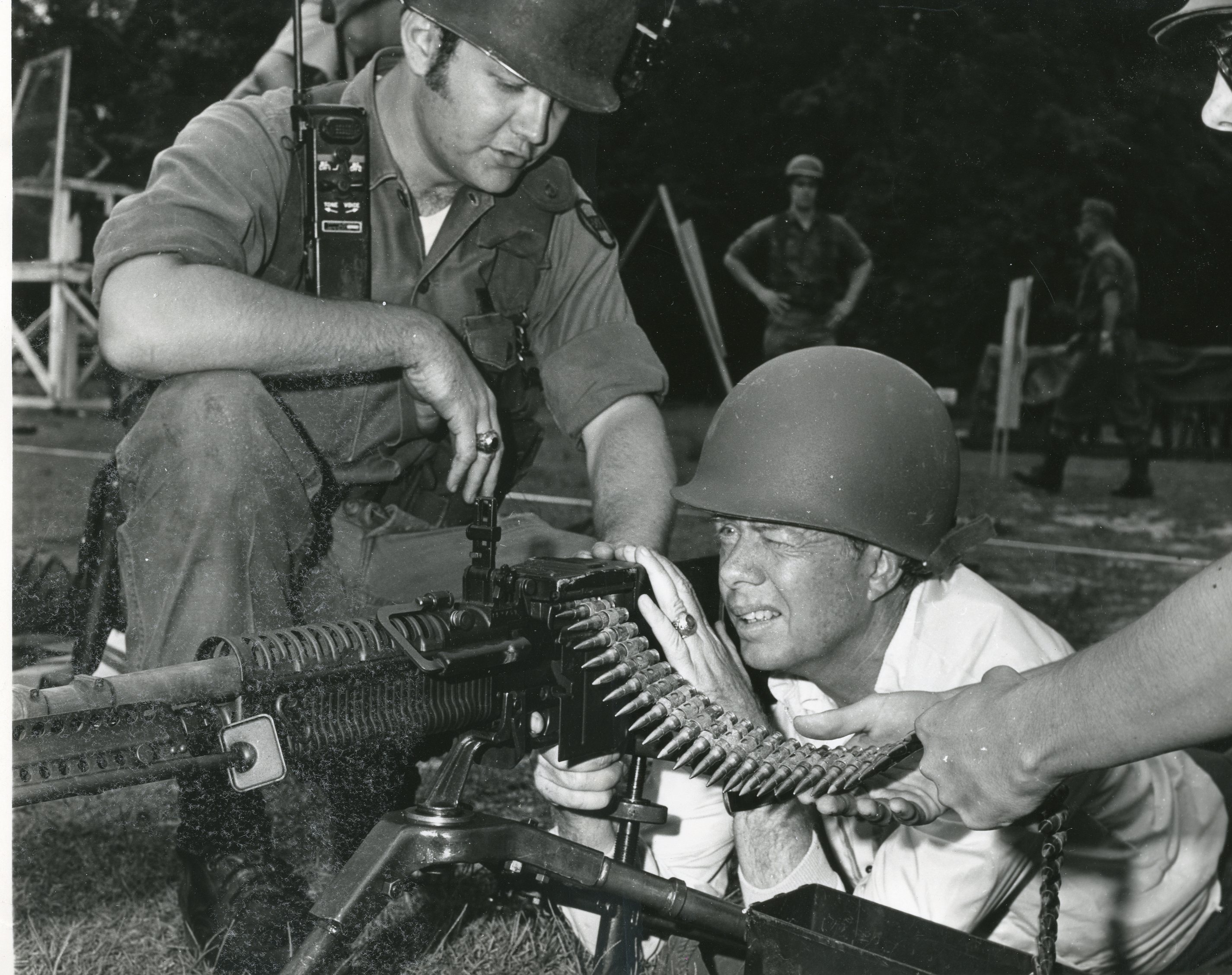
Carter preparing to fire an M60 machine gun during a visit to Georgia Army National Guard troops, 1972

=== Education ===
Carter made improving Georgia's infamously poor education system a top priority of time as governor. He pushed through the state legislature a package that greatly increased funding of schools and maximized their efficiency. The 1974 Adequate Program for Education in Georgia bill aimed to improve education by distributing funding of schools fairly between affluent and poorer districts and reducing individual class sizes for efficiency, among other things. He also led a campaign that wound up creating a statewide kindergarten program.

=== Civil rights ===
Contrary to the campaign he had run, Carter passionately supported civil rights and sought to expand them. He immediately backtracked on his civil rights positions during the election, plainly stating "the time for discrimination is over" in his inaugural address. He added, "No poor, rural, weak, or black person should ever have to bear the additional burden of being deprived of the opportunity of an education, a job, or simple justice. This sparked fury and feelings of betrayal among hardline conservatives who had supported him. He appointed large numbers of African-Americans to state offices and had portraits of civil rights leaders hung on the State Capitol. During the election, he had told Vernon Jordan, a civil rights attorney in Atlanta who in 1970 became the head of the United Negro College Fund, "You won’t like my campaign, but you will like my administration." Aware that Maddox was firmly opposed to Carter's new liberal positions, he sought to abolish the office of Lieutenant Governor, and when that failed he tried to strip it of all its power. Carter began openly antagonizing Maddox, vowing to fight with him if he attempted to undermine his policies.

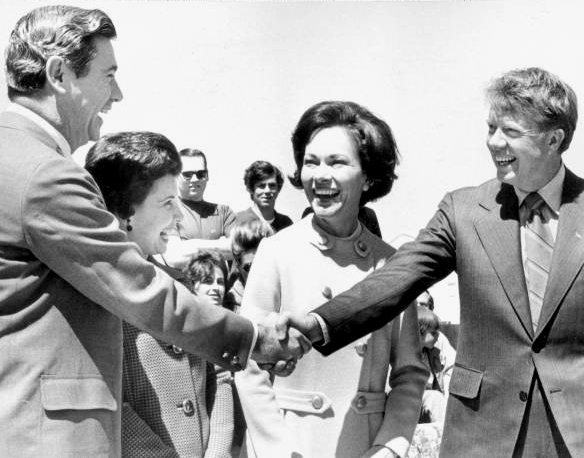
Florida Governor Reubin Askew and his wife (left) welcome Carter and his wife to the reviewing stand to watch the Springtime Tallahassee Parade, 1971

More African-Americans were appointed to agency offices and judicial positions by Carter than by every other previous Georgia governor combined. Many were also appointed to his own staff. However, Carter was opposed to busing. He worked with Florida governor Reubin Askew and Wallace to promote an anti-busing amendment to the United States constitution. He stated in a 1972 interview that he "always opposed the massive busing of students to achieve any sort of artificial racial balance", and believed that the practice had a detrimental effect on the education of both black and white children and diminished the influence of parents over their children's educational environment. He would later defend his position by stating "[t]he only kids who get bused are the poor children. I’ve never seen a rich kid bused."

=== Spending ===
Carter aggressively sought to reduce rampant deficit spending, redundancy, and bureaucracy. He reorganized the government by merging more than 300 state agencies into merely 22, although the extent to which this succeeded in cutting deficit spending remains unclear. This was done with the goal of combining similar functions into a single administrative body to clamp down on duplicate spending. Three agencies in particular (Administrative Services, Natural Resources, and Human Resources) absorbed the purview and responsibilities of a total of 62 smaller agencies. In conjunction with this, he came up with a controversial zero-based budgeting plan, under which all state departments would start with the year with a clean slate in terms of spending, having to justify each request for expenditure funding rather than piling incremental increases year by year.

== Legacy ==
Georgia voted overwhelmingly for Carter in each of his presidential campaigns, including his dramatically unsuccessful reelection bid in the 1980 election. He received 83% of the state's votes in the 1976 Democratic Party presidential primaries and 67% in the general election. He received 88% in the hotly contested 1980 primaries and 56% in that year's general election. He remains the only president to have hailed from Georgia.

== See also ==
- Electoral history of Jimmy Carter
- Presidency of Jimmy Carter
