= WKEU =

WKEU may refer to:

- WKEU (AM), a radio station (1450 AM) licensed to Griffin, Georgia, United States
- WKEU-FM, a radio station (88.9 FM) licensed to The Rock, Georgia, United States
