= William Guilford =

American politician

Member of the Georgia House of Representatives from the Upson County, Georgia district
- In office 1868–1870

Personal details
- Born: February 5, 1844
- Died: October 1909 (aged 65)
- Party: Republican
- Spouse: Lourinda
- Parent: Guilford Speer

William A. Guilford (5 February 1844 – c. October 1909) was a businessman and state legislator from Upson County, Georgia. Guilford was a representative to Georgia's constitutional congress in 1868 and was an elected representative in Georgia's assembly during the 1868–1870 term. He was a Republican. William Guilford's father, Guilford Speer, had operated a harness and shoe shop in Thomaston, Upson County, since at least the 1840s, and was a founding organizer of St. Mary's A.M.E. Church. William Guilford opened a barber shop in Thomaston, and was involved in organizing the county's annual Emancipation Day celebration, still observed on or about 29 May each year.

Guilford married a woman named Lourinda. Their known children included William (died before 1870), Guilford, Duffield, Lincoln, Douglass, Richard, Ludie, Benjamin, and Lidie (Lydia). He owned 12 acres of land in Thomaston, Georgia. Guilford was one of several witnesses on behalf of political activist William Fincher of Pike County, who was accused of vagrancy in 1868. The case was submitted to the U.S. Congress as an example of a violation of Civil Rights. The jury sentenced the man to a year of hard labor on the public roads.

Rufus B. Bullock, the provisional governor of Georgia filed documents in support of Guilford serving in the Georgia House of Representatives after the 1868 election when top vote getter J.C. Drake was disqualified.
