= Thelma Thompson Slayden =

Author

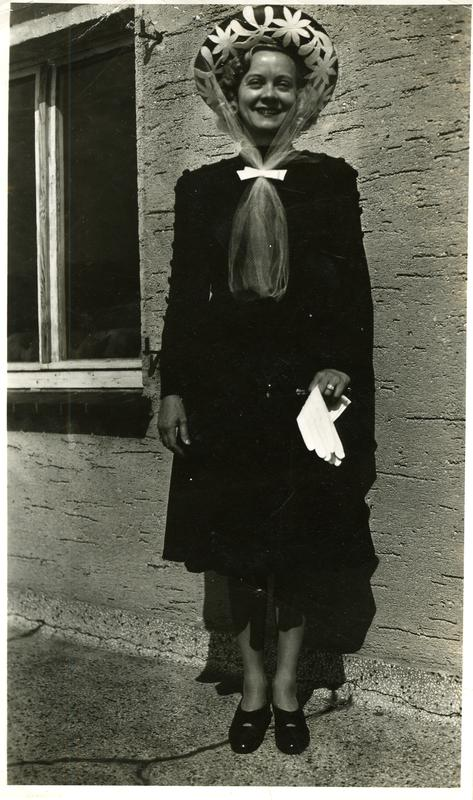
- Occupation: Novelist
- Spouse: Walter Scott Slayden (1904–1988) (m. 1934)

Signature
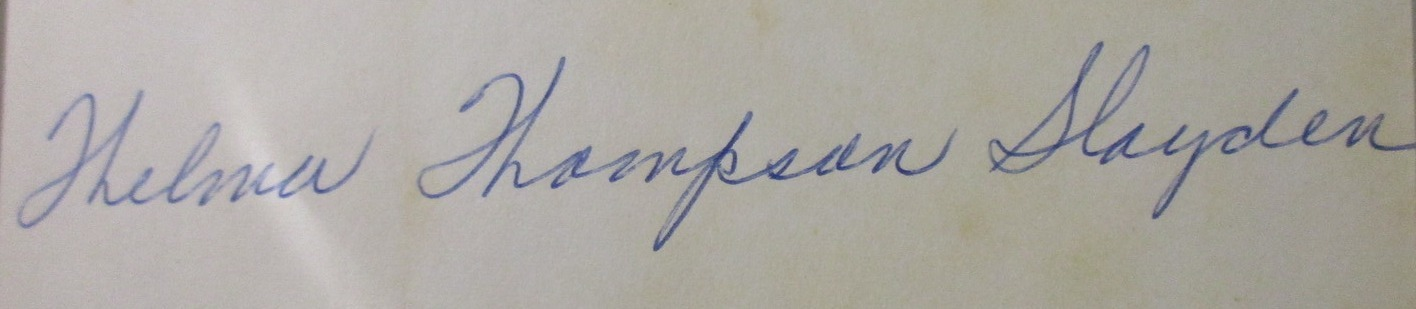

Thelma Thompson Slayden (1907–1977) was an author of several novels, many short stories, and magazine articles. Her novels focused on medical needs of underserved communities, which led to recognition from the President of the United States for her contributions leading to healthcare legislation.

== Early life ==
Slayden was born in Ashland, Alabama. She spent many years in Thomaston, Georgia, where she taught school and was the principal for two elementary schools. She married the Reserve Officer Training Corps Sergeant Walter Scott Slayden on June 3, 1934, after meeting him at R. E. Lee Institute (now Upson-Lee High School) while they were both teaching there. She lived in Thomaston when she wrote her first book titled Give Us This Night, which was published by Arcadia House in New York, 1939, with a second edition published in 1945. Her additional best-selling published works are:

- Make Haste, My Beloved. New York; Austin-Phelps, 1952.
- Miracle in Alaska. New York; F. Fell, 1963.
- As well as numerous short stories and articles.

She and her husband, then Major Slayden in World War II, were stationed in Germany and traveled Europe together. Mrs. Slayden wrote an article in the Atlanta Journal Magazine where she recollects:

"Once upon a time, before the Big War, I lived with my husband and typewriter in our house in Thomaston, Georgia, where my main problem was the weaving of intricate plots for my fictitious heroes and heroines. Then one thing led to another and I followed the same husband and brought the same typewriter to Marburg, Germany, where the facts of my new life as Frau Slayden sound more fantastic than any of my fiction."

== First novel ==
The novel, Give Us This Night is a story in a cotton mill town named Lowell in Middle Georgia and is set in the time of the "New South." It tells the story of the romance between the daughter of the cotton mill owner and a young orthopedic surgeon as they develop a Foundation for polio victims and others in need in Warm Springs, Georgia, the same place frequented by President Franklin Delano Roosevelt.

== Accomplishments ==
Slayden taught Creative Writing at Emory University and the University of Georgia. She was the Atlanta Writers Club President in 1957-1958. She brought prominent speakers to the Club, including Dr. Corbett H. Thigpen, coauthor of The Three Faces of Eve. Slayden's tenure was highlighted by the first Yearbook since 1950 and the induction of 23 new members with fifty professional sales including six books. Slayden has contributed articles to several national magazines and authored five novels depicting factual medical background. Miracle in Alaska won the National League of American Pen Women award the AWC Aurelia Austin Writer of the Year Award. Because three of her novels dealt with the Public Health Service, she was invited to the White House Rose Garden in the mid-1960s by President Lyndon B. Johnson to witness his signing of public health legislation. President Johnson presented her with a pen "to encourage you to write another book." Slayden was included in Who's Who in the South and Southwest, Who's Who of American Women, and Atlanta's Golden Book of Who's Who in Greater Atlanta.

Her description in the 1961 Who's Who of American Women lists these accomplishments:

- Education and University Teaching - Georgia State College for Women, 1925; University of Georgia, 1928; Emory University, 1930; Columbia, 1945; and University of Marburg, Germany, 1946.
- Honors - Work for National Leprosy Act; Woodmen of World, 1952
- Memberships - National League of American Pen Women (President Georgia 1956–1958; National Correspondence Secretary 1958– ); National Federation of Women's Clubs (Life Member, Atlanta); American Legion Auxiliary; Beta Sigma Phi (International Honorary Member, 1952); Atlanta Writer's Club (President 1957–1958).

Slayden released Make Haste, My Beloved in 1952. She spent time in the National Leprosarium in Carville, Louisiana, as research for the novel, her fourth and most influential novel. The mistreatment and stigma she witnessed of those suffering from Hansen's Disease inspired her mission to help veterans who have contracted leprosy while in service. She convinced Florida ex-senator Claude Pepper to introduce the National Leprosy Act to the 81st Congress. Her efforts led to servicemen receiving the proper care and attention needed.
