= National Register of Historic Places listings in Upson County, Georgia =

This is a list of properties and districts in Upson County, Georgia that are listed on the National Register of Historic Places (NRHP).

This National Park Service list is complete through NPS recent listings posted March 21, 2025.

== Current listings ==
	Name on the Register	Image	Date listed	Location	City or town	Description
1	Auchumpkee Creek Covered Bridge	Auchumpkee Creek Covered Bridge	April 1, 1975 (#75000614)	10 miles (16 km) SE of Thomaston off U.S. 19 on Allen Rd. 32°45′20″N 84°13′55″W	Thomaston	
2	Sydney Barron House	Sydney Barron House	June 3, 1994 (#94000526)	505 Stewart Ave. 32°52′56″N 84°19′19″W	Thomaston	
3	W. A. Harp House	W. A. Harp House	April 19, 1990 (#90000636)	206 Barnesville St. 32°53′20″N 84°19′18″W	Thomaston	
4	John and Effie McDaniel House		June 24, 2021 (#100006662)	317 West Main St. 32°53′16″N 84°19′45″W	Thomaston	
5	Rose Hill Mill and House	Rose Hill Mill and House	March 10, 1980 (#80001250)	NW of Thomaston on Thompson Lane and Hanna Mill Rd. 32°56′00″N 84°21′18″W	Thomaston	
6	Silvertown Historic District		April 5, 2021 (#100006336)	Approx. 1 mile (1.6 km) north of downtown along US 19; 32°54′09″N 84°19′46″W	Thomaston	
7	Upson County Courthouse	Upson County Courthouse	September 18, 1980 (#80001251)	Courthouse Sq. 32°53′15″N 84°19′36″W	Thomaston	
