= The Rock, Georgia =

- Unincorporated community Census-designated place
- Location within Georgia
- Coordinates: 32°57′50″N 84°14′28″W
- Country: United States
- State: Georgia
- County: Upson
- Elevation: 823 ft (251 m)
- Time zone: UTC-5 (Eastern (EST))
  - Summer (DST): UTC-4 (EDT)
- ZIP code: 30285
- Area code: 706
- GNIS feature ID: 333213

The Rock is an unincorporated community and census-designated place in Upson County, Georgia, United States; as of the 2020 census, it had a population of 179. The Rock is located on Georgia State Route 36, 7 miles (11 km) northeast of Thomaston. The Rock has a post office with ZIP code 30285, although the post office is on the list to be closed. The Rock is also home to the area-famous Rock Ranch, a small theme park with a farming theme. The Rock is bordered by the cities of Barnesville, Hannahs Mill, Meansville, and Yatesville.

== History ==
A post office called The Rock was established in 1853. The community was named for a rock formation near the original town site.

The Georgia General Assembly incorporated The Rock as a town in 1877. The town's municipal charter was repealed in 1995.

In 1847, the Central of Georgia Railway opened its Thomaston to Barnesville line, which ran through The Rock. In 1963, the Southern Railway (U.S.) acquired the Central of Georgia, and with it, the line in The Rock. When the Southern merged with the N&W to form the Norfolk Southern Railway in 1982, the line in The Rock, as well as all former CofG trackage, went to NS. In 2016, NS leased the line to its current operator, CaterParrot Railnet.

== Demographics ==
Historical population
Census	Pop.	Note	%±
1900	180		—
1910	188		4.4%
1920	181		−3.7%
1930	171		−5.5%
1940	179		4.7%
1950	147		−17.9%
1960	115		−21.8%
1970	136		18.3%
1980	78		−42.6%
1990	88		12.8%
2010	160		—
2020	179		11.9%
U.S. Decennial Census; 1850-1870 1870-1880; 1890-1910 1920-1930; 1940 1950 1960; 1970 1980 1990; 2000 2010 2020

The Rock first appeared in the 1900 U.S. Census as a town. It did not appear in the 2000 U.S. census after the town was dissolved. It was listed as a census designated place in the 2010 U.S. census.

The Rock CDP, Georgia – Racial and ethnic composition Note: the US Census treats Hispanic/Latino as an ethnic category. This table excludes Latinos from the racial categories and assigns them to a separate category. Hispanics/Latinos may be of any race.
Race / Ethnicity (NH = Non-Hispanic)	Pop 2010	Pop 2020	% 2010	% 2020
White alone (NH)	148	149	92.50%	83.24%
Black or African American alone (NH)	2	11	1.25%	6.15%
Native American or Alaska Native alone (NH)	0	0	0.00%	0.00%
Asian alone (NH)	0	0	0.00%	0.00%
Pacific Islander alone (NH)	0	0	0.00%	0.00%
Some Other Race alone (NH)	0	0	0.00%	0.00%
Mixed Race or Multi-Racial (NH)	0	6	0.00%	3.35%
Hispanic or Latino (any race)	10	13	6.25%	7.26%
Total	160	179	100.00%	100.00%
