= Women during the Reconstruction era =

Women during the Reconstruction era following the US Civil War, from 1863 to 1877, acted as the heads of their households due to the involvement of men in the war, and presided over their farm and family members throughout the country. Following the war, there was a great surge for education among women and to coincide with this, a great need for women to find paid employment. As the educational opportunity began involving women, illiteracy declined and women were able to attain education. Soon after, many women became newspaper editors and journalists and began being more heavily involved within the community and local and national politics. Women began increasing their efforts towards suffrage and influencing public policy. African American women were also heavily involved in suffrage and with their involvement in the Methodist Episcopal Church South and the Women's Christian Temperance Union (WCTU).

== Education ==
Educational Publication

Prior to the 1830s, women in the New England area began to have more opportunities to receive education due to changes in public policy. In 1840, literacy was nearly universal for women, with a twenty percent increase from sixty years earlier. Women began receiving greater opportunities for education as seen through the expansion of free education, the professional training of teachers, and the organization of higher educational opportunities for women. Women received great opposition to educational opportunities during the late 18th and early 19th century as well, as women were only allowed to receive schooling during the summer period, prioritized enrollment in schooling for men, as well as the exclusion of females from grammar schools, teaching both Latin and Greek. In addition, women were often faced with beliefs in opposition to furthering their education, such as the universal belief at that time that women's brains were smaller in capacity and therefore inferior to the male brain.

Vassar, Wellesley and Smith, and Bryn Mawr colleges were founded during the Reconstruction Era with the intent of creating greater opportunities for women in higher education. These women's colleges offered encouragement in scientific investigation, and tasks requiring patience and delicate manipulation—the work often thought of that men refused to do. Educational opportunities for women consisted of embroidery, painting, French, singing, and the playing of instruments. Though women were provided increased opportunities, they were often still seen as assistants and aid to men. In 1868, the Woman's infirmary Medical School was opened and began making innovations in the field of medicine. Education for African American varied to some degree. For many women they stopped at the primary grades. For African American women, education was difficult because they struggled with illiteracy, were seen as outsiders, and were needed for domestic labor to support their families. Between 1860 and 1910 the birthrate declined by one-third. The founding of the Mount Hermon Seminary in Mississippi in 1875 created an opportunity for African American women to receive a quality education. By 1890 only thirty Negro women had received college degrees.

== Employment ==
Social change began taking place between 1780 and 1835, and as a result made shifts in women's patterns of work. The norm for adult women during this time remained household occupation. Leading up to the Reconstruction Era, the growth of school teaching became expansive and allowed women a non-domestic occupation. As populations grew in large cities, improvements in transportation were made, and markets focused on the consumer's needs began thriving, the importance of women's work within the home declined. In the 1860s, the number of children per white woman was just over five and by 1910 it had dropped to under three and a half. In 1870, two percent of office workers were women, and by 1920 that number had increased to 45 percent with 92 percent of stenographers; a large majority of individuals in these positions were native-born, white women. Though the birthrate began dropping, women began working in jobs uncommon ten years prior. The birthrate for African American women declined by one-third between 1860 and 1910. With their husbands away at war, women began working in retail establishments and manufacturing plants and became plantation owners. Women's involvement in unions also begin increasing. The first two national unions to admit women to membership was the cigar makers in 1867 and the printers in 1869. Women participated in numerous unions throughout the country, including the Knights of Labor, American Federation of Labor, Working Women's Association, National Labor Union, Ironmolders Union, and countless others. They lead out in the shoemakers strike of 1860 and also took part in the bread riots that occurred in 1863 and 1864, causing high prices and food shortages. Women desiring to practice law also faced difficulty in that in 1873 citizenship did not confer the right to practice law. In 1874, the Illinois legislature passed legislator that provided that no one could be prevented from any occupation, profession or employment (except the military) on account of sex. Women factory workers were common in the mid-nineteenth century. From 1860 to 1870, women factory workers rose from 270,987 to 323,370, as thousands of women were forces into the labor market when the men went off to war.

== Publishing ==
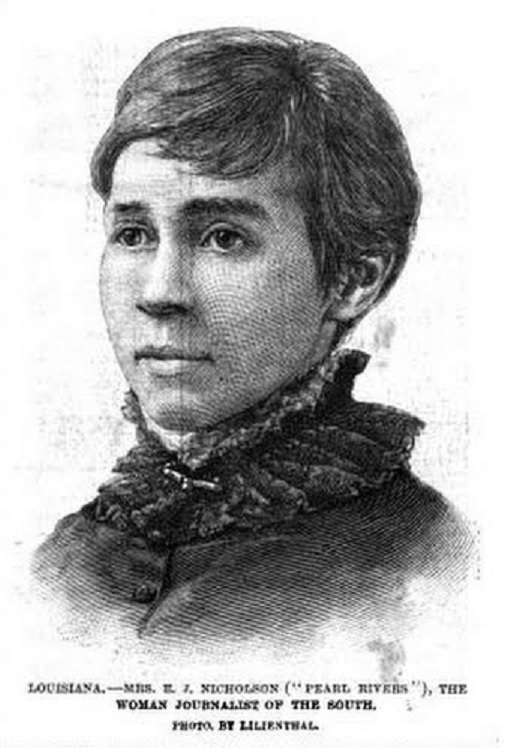
Eliza Jane Poitevent

Eliza Jane Poitevent, also known as Pearl Rivers, the owner of the New Orleans Picayune, along with other women such as Elia Good Byington, Mary Ann Thomas, Florence Williams, Addie McGrath, published papers primarily devoted to women's rights and were all very influential among the general public, despite the fact it was a time and place when societal norms were rigidly enforced. The New Orleans Picayune published a series of opinions on the great number of women needing work and the conditions that Southern Women must face in the work place. Labor reform was often a topic of discussion among editorials. In 1866, a book entitled The Last Ninety Days of the War in North Carolina, by Cornelia Phillips Spencer, was published offering opinions of work allotted to women and their place in society. Her publication gained great popularity and her opinion began being sought by public officials throughout the state of North Carolina and by administrators at the University of North Carolina. Though it held little political influence, Louisa May Alcott's Little Women was published 1868 and had an influence among women challenging women's socialization into home life. In 1882, Elizabeth Stuart Phelps published a novel entitled, Doctor Zay and was a novel about women doctors of that period, with the intent to portray women as being able to "have it all", having both a successful career and marriage. Between 1870 and 1890 thirty-three suffrage periodicals existed. The Women's Journal, published in 1870 by Lucy Stone, was yet another way to achieve women advocacy and was a pathway for women to gain further support for suffrage movements. This periodical was said to have been the most influential of all the suffrage publishings as it had over thirty thousand readers by 1883.

== Suffrage ==
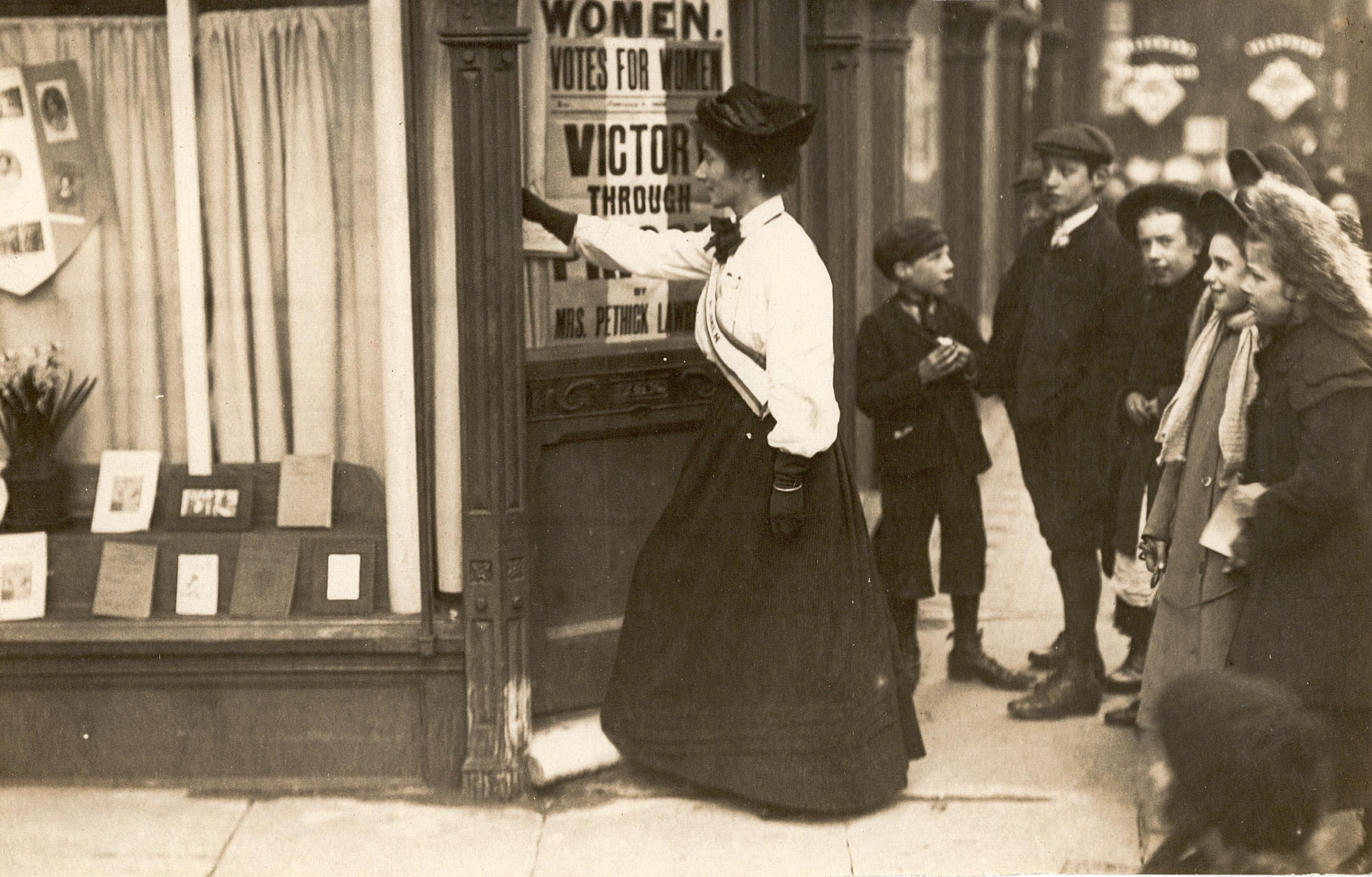
Women's Political Involvement

During the Civil War, women's rights movements had been pushed to the side. However, with the ending of the war and the start of Reconstruction, women began to advocate for their rights, and especially so for women's suffrage. On May 14, 1863 Susan B. Anthony and Elizabeth Cady Stanton, women's rights activists, organized a meeting of "The Loyal Women of the Nation" located in New York. The meeting was held in support of the thirteenth amendment, knowing it would assist in the woman's desire and ability to vote. At the closing of the meeting, the National Woman's Loyal League was established and though the organization disbanded a little over a year later, the women were able to gather over 400,000 signatures in support of the thirteenth amendment. This organization allowed women to see the effect organizations could have and laid the foundation for many other suffrage and women organizations throughout the country.

The congressional passage of the Enforcement Act in May 1870 to strengthen the Fifteenth Amendment was an opportunity for women to vote. With the intent to allow greater voting freedoms to citizens, women used it as their pathway to suffrage. Women took to the polls in groups, including a group of fifty women who attempted to vote with Susan B. Anthony. Women's attempts to register and to vote were usually denied, resulting in many women, including Virginia Minor and Ellen Van Valkenberg, suing election officials.

During the late 1860s there were secret suffragists scattered throughout the south and following the end of the war began becoming vice-presidents of the Equal Rights Association in states such as Virginia, North Carolina, South Carolina, Texas, Florida and Tennessee. White women soon realized that in order to reconcile with the white in the South and work towards suffrage, they would need to abandon African American women efforts towards suffrage and equal rights.

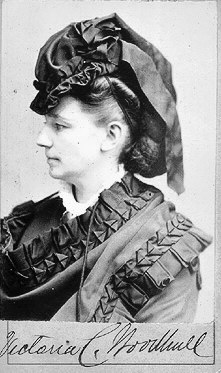
Victoria Woodhull

Victoria Woodhull was a prominent figure in the women's suffrage movement during the 1870s and also an example of female political involvement within the United States. In 1870, pushing the limits of female citizenship, She announced her candidacy for president and was the first women to run for president. She advocated the importance of popular sovereignty, and argued that women were included in the first section of the Fourteenth Amendment as citizens. She asked to present before Congress in 1871 on women's suffrage, but was rejected by a majority vote. Despite her loss, Woodhull's presentation was significant in that she was the first woman to present before a congressional committee. Additionally, her presentation began spreading the interest in women suffrage beyond the average women, and her dedication made way for other women to become involved in politics, such as Mary Elizabeth Lease, and even mended the rivalry of two suffrage organizations and lead to the dedication of the National American Woman Suffrage Association.

Susan B. Anthony and Elizabeth Cady Stanton, the founders of the National Woman Suffrage Association and Lucy Stone and Julia Ward Howe, the founders of the American Woman Suffrage Association, though often at conflict with one another, were able to mend their disagreements due to Victoria Woodhull's great efforts. Susan B. Anthony and Elizabeth Cady Stantons's involvement in suffrage and politics, was seen through their countless efforts of speeches, publications, the founding of the National Woman Suffrage Association, as well as actions of civil disobedience seen by them wearing revealing dresses, demanding the right to vote at polls, participating in the Underground Railroad, and refusing to pay legal fees when they felt them unnecessary. These women's work paved the way for the passing of the 19th amendment and freedoms for women for years to come.

Following Woodhull's, Anthony's, and Stanton's example, other women presented suffrage arguments in government, including Hannah Tracy Cutler and Margaret V. Longley presenting before the Kentucky legislature in 1872.

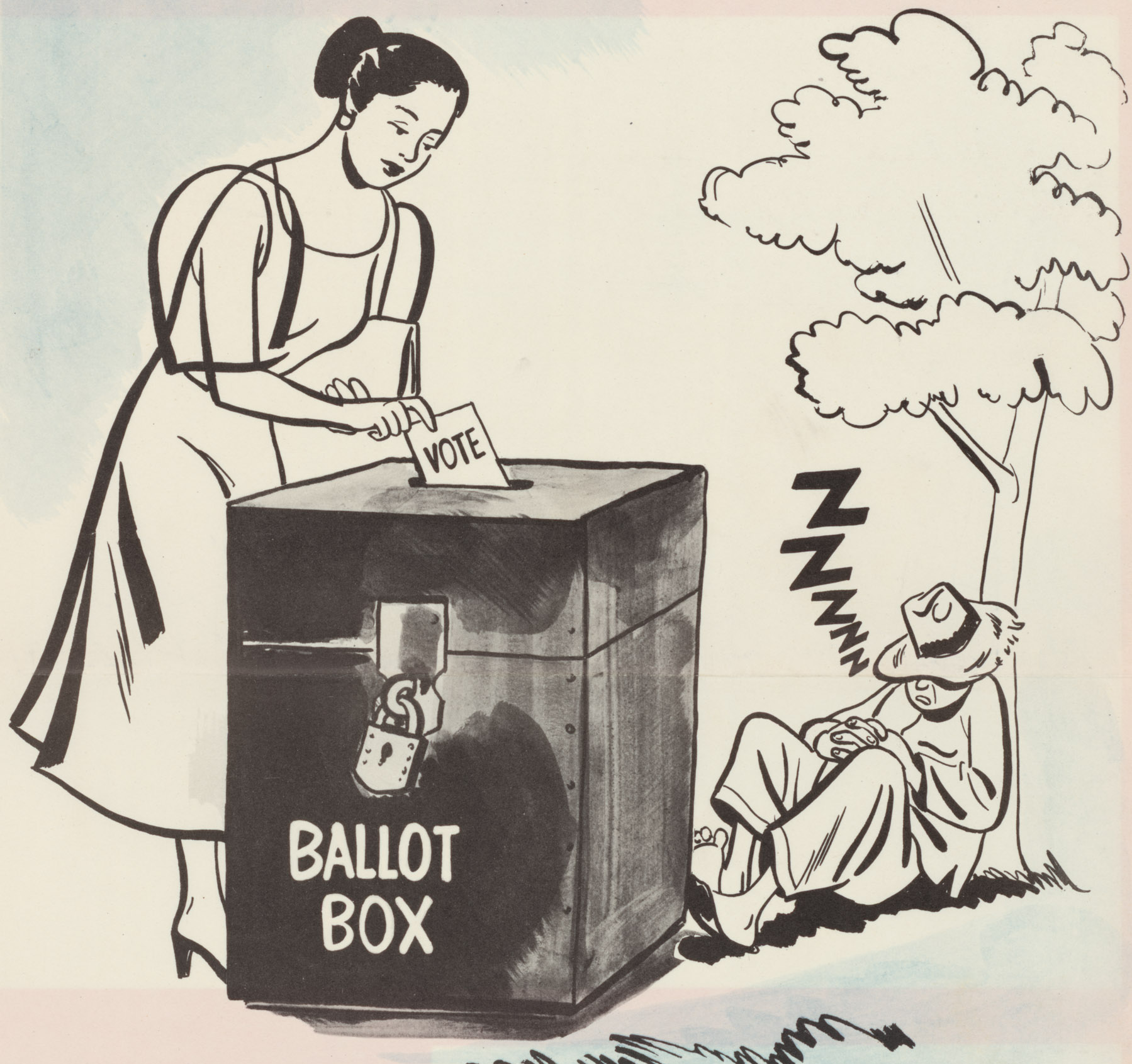

== African American women ==
=== Church involvement ===
In the 1870s, Methodist, Baptist, and Presbyterian women all over the south, predominantly African American women, organized missionary societies that studied geography, raised money, and recruited individuals to travel globally in support of women empowerment. These missions acted as training schools for women's involvement in public life and a greater involvement in politics. In pursuit of greater women empowerment, women actively sought to preach and gain status within the Methodist Episcopal Church South and churches all throughout the south. Baptist and Methodist male leaders agreed that it was forbidden for women to act in leadership roles within the church and strongly opposed the action. Despite this opposition, with continued female persistence, in 1878 the Southern Methodist General Conference authorized the organization of a Women's Board of Foreign Missions, comprising 218 societies and 5,890 members. This society lead to tens of thousands of women involvement in school boards, hospitals and local city organizations all around the country.

The progress of women's involvement within the Baptist and Methodist church lead to greater self-confidence and independence for women and was the foundation of the Women's club movement and subsequent club organizations and ultimately lead to political involvement within the United States for women.

In addition to their efforts within the Baptist and Methodist church, one of the most successful organizations in rallying women together was that of Women's Christian Temperance Union (WCTU). Founded in 1874, the WCTU was one of the first organizations to welcome African American women in their efforts within the Temperance Movement.

=== Political involvement ===
African American women became politically involved during Reconstruction including: the establishment of Civic Improvement Leagues, the fight for abolition of child labor, involvement in prohibition, the pursuit of educational rights for women, and, critically, women's suffrage. While the right to vote was only given to black men, black women also took a part in voting and political activism. Voting was seen as a family matter, so often freedmen would not submit their ballots without their wives' approval and opinion. African American women additionally played a large role in organizations such as the National Woman Suffrage Association (NWSA) and the American Equal Right Association (AERA). Though they were heavily involved within the NWSA, clubwomen often distanced themselves from African American women due largely to influx of newcomers who had not been involved in the anti-slavery movement unlike their white predecessors. They attended political rallies and would show support for candidates or protest others, using their voices to impact public opinion. Many freedwomen even attended the polls. They would go with male family members to oversee how they voted, and some women attempted to vote themselves. In 1870, five black women were arrested for voting in South Carolina. The political activism of African American women, especially in the South, led to increased racial violence against them. Black women who took an interest in politics were at risk of violence from white men, and some were killed. Despite the violence they faced, Africa American women remained active in politics throughout the Reconstruction Era.

== Southern women ==
Southern white women became increasingly involved in politics during Reconstruction. Women worked as liaisons between the Federal government and their male family members. Women would petition for husbands, sons, fathers, and brothers who were arrested for participation in the Confederacy or crimes committed against federal soldiers and freedmen. This led to Southern women gaining a deep knowledge of laws and political processes, unlike before when these women rarely played a role in issues outside of their homes. Women would go before the courts, and some even petitioned directly to President Andrew Johnson. They used strategies such as using their gender to play on the sympathy of men to free their family members. These women also supported white male efforts to disenfranchise freedmen. They saw black men gaining political power as a threat to their own political and physical security. When a male family member was charged for violence against freedmen, women would defend them by denying or reinterpreting the accusations against them. White women took up roles as the heads of their homes and kept them in order when fathers and husbands were arrested. By the turn of the century a large majority of southern women were employed.
