= Sprewell Bluff Park =

Park in Upson County, Georgia, United States

- IUCN category V (protected landscape/seascape)
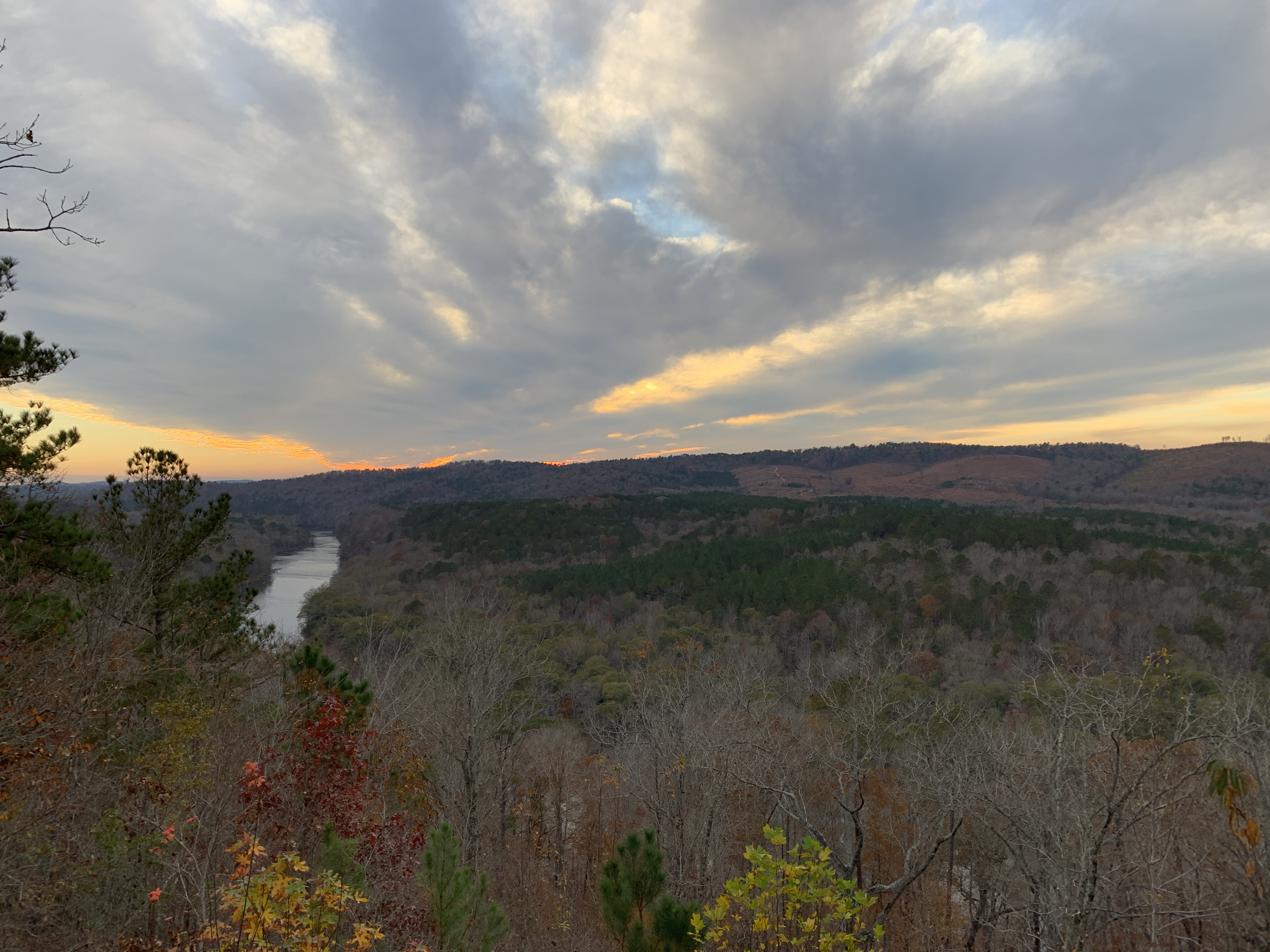
- View from overlook at Sprewell Bluff Park
- Interactive map of Sprewell Bluff Park
- Location: Upson County, Georgia, U.S.
- Nearest city: Roland, Crest
- Coordinates: 32°52′16″N 84°28′26″W
- Area: 1,372 acres (5.55 km^{2})
- Operator: Upson County
- Website: upsoncountyga.org/199/Sprewell-Bluff-Park

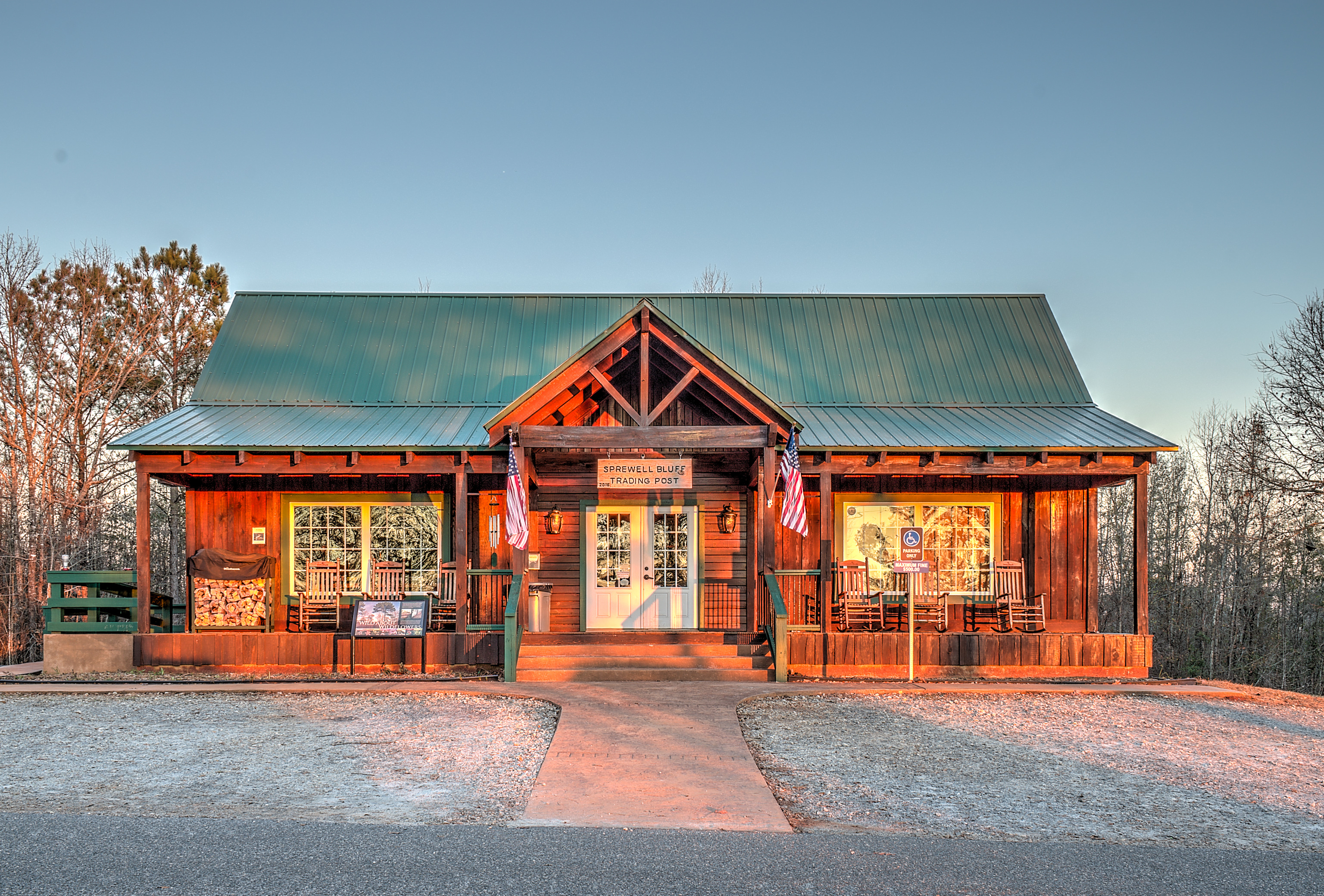
Trading Post

Sprewell Bluff Park, formerly Sprewell Bluff State Park, is a 1,372 acre (5.55 km^{2}) Upson County, Georgia, park located between Roland and Crest. The park's location on the Flint River makes it a popular place for swimming, fishing, kayaking, canoeing, and whitewater rafting. The park features a three-mile walking trail (4.8 km) that winds along the bank of the river and up rocky bluffs, offering views of the park below.

== History ==
The central river bluff was named after Jeptha Sprewell, a pioneer citizen. The park was part of The Heritage Trust Commission established by Governor Jimmy Carter in 1972. The commission was responsible for meeting the needs for recreational areas for the growing population. The park land is owned by Georgia Power Company. The State of Georgia originally leased the land in the 1990s as a State Park. In 2013, Upson County took over management of the property.

== Facilities ==
- Boat Ramp
- Picnic Area
- Hiking Trail
- Trading Post
- Cabins
- RV Sites

== Annual events ==
- Rock Skipping Contest (Labor Day)
- Three Rivers Throwdown
