= WKEU-FM =

- The Rock, Georgia; United States
- Broadcast area: far south Atlanta metro
- Frequency: 88.9 MHz
- Branding: The Rock

Programming
- Format: Classic hits
- Affiliations: ABC Radio

Ownership
- Owner: Georgia Public Radio, Inc.
- Sister stations: WKEU AM 1450

History
- First air date: 1999

Technical information
- Licensing authority: FCC
- Facility ID: 23908
- Class: C2
- ERP: 5,000 watts
- HAAT: 233 m (764 ft)
- Transmitter coordinates: 32°59′11.00″N 84°21′56.00″W

Links
- Public license information: Public file; LMS
- Webcast: Listen Live
- Website: wkeuradio.com

WKEU-FM 88.9 is an FM radio station broadcasting a classic hits format. Its city of license is The Rock, Georgia, United States. The station is owned by Georgia Public Radio, Inc. (no relation to Georgia Public Broadcasting's GPB Radio), and also features radio programming from ABC Radio. Having an original airdate in 1999, it is the sister station of WKEU AM 1450, in nearby Griffin, Georgia. The broadcast callsign was previously on 97.5 in Fayetteville, Georgia, also nearby.

WKEU-FM is highly unusual in that the vast majority of noncommercial educational stations in the U.S. are either college radio, Christian radio, public radio, or one of a few indie radio stations. In contrast, this station does not appear to be supported by any such group, nor does it engage in any on-air underwriting, pledge drives, or any other fundraising activities, nor any self-promotion of its own programming or of the organization that operates it. It also has almost no talking between songs, and no radio DJs, instead seeming to be run by broadcast automation. Classic rock is also nearly unheard-of on a noncommercial station, instead being more likely on commercial radio, which Atlanta already has one of on full-power WSRV FM.
