= Dog Crossing, Georgia =

- Unincorporated community
- Location within the state of Georgia Dog Crossing, Georgia (the United States)
- Coordinates: 32°58′53″N 84°15′41″W
- Country: United States
- State: Georgia
- County: Upson
- Elevation: 758 ft (231 m)
- Time zone: UTC-5 (Eastern (EST))
  - Summer (DST): UTC-4 (EDT)
- Area codes: 706 & 762
- GNIS ID: 331566

Dog Crossing is an unincorporated community in Upson County, Georgia, United States.
