= Upson (surname) =

Upson is a surname. Notable people with the surname include:

- Arthur Upson, American poet
- Charles Upson, U.S. Representative from Michigan
- Christopher C. Upson, U.S. Representative from Texas
- Devonte Upson (born 1993), American basketball player in the Israeli Basketball Premier League
- Donna Upson, Canadian white supremacist
- Jill Upson, American politician
- Matthew Upson, English football player
- Maxwell Upson, trustee of Cornell University
- Nicola Upson (born 1970), British novelist
- Ralph Hazlett Upson, American balloonist
- Stephen Upson, American politician and lawyer
- William Hazlett Upson, American author
