= James L. Bentley =

American politician (1927–2003)

James Lynwood Bentley, Jr.

Comptroller General of Georgia
- In office 1963–1971
- Preceded by: Zack D. Cravey
- Succeeded by: Johnnie L. Caldwell

Personal details
- Born: June 15, 1927 Upson County, Georgia, USA
- Died: November 7, 2003 (aged 76)
- Party: Democratic (until 1968); Republican (1968–2003)
- Spouse: Gwen Bentley
- Children: Betty Bentley Watson James Lynwood Bentley, III Samuel Jackson Bentley

James Lynwood Bentley, Jr. (June 15, 1927 in Upson County, Georgia – November 7, 2003), was from 1963 to 1971 the comptroller general of Georgia (the office that later became known as the Insurance and Safety Fire Commissioner). Originally a Democrat, Bentley and four other constitutional officers in Georgia switched to the Republican Party in 1968 to protest the violence that shook the Democratic National Convention in Chicago, Illinois that year.

== 1970 gubernatorial election ==
Bentley unsuccessfully sought the 1970 Republican gubernatorial nomination. He was defeated by a more liberal candidate, Hal Suit, an Atlanta news broadcaster who opposed capital punishment. Suit polled 62,868 primary votes (58.5 percent) to Bentley's 40,251 (37.4 percent).

In the primary race, Bentley carried the backing of the 1966 Republican gubernatorial standard-bearer and the state's Republican national committeeman, Howard Callaway, even though Bentley had earlier voted for Callaway's Democratic opponent, Lester Maddox (who was ultimately elected as governor by the state legislature). Bentley said that he was shunned by the GOP regulars who "seemed somewhat indignant because we had not consulted the Republican leadership before we joined." Bentley blamed his primary loss on "stand-pat" Republicans practicing "kamikaze" politics.

Suit subsequently lost the general election to Democrat Jimmy Carter, 41-59 percent.

== Early life and family ==
Bentley graduated from Robert E. Lee High School in Thomaston, Georgia in 1944, where he became a Cadet Captain in the Lee Reserve Officer Training Corps program. He attended Emory at Oxford College for a short time, then joined the Navy. He served from 1945 to 1946 as an aviation flight crewman in the Naval Air Corps. After discharge, he went back to Oxford College of Emory University and transferred to the University of Georgia School in 1947. He received his Bachelor of Laws (LL.B.) degree from the University of Georgia School of Law in 1950. Bentley served as executive secretary to Governor Herman Talmadge from 1951 through 1955.

Bentley was survived by his wife of 52 years, Gwen Bentley; his daughter, Betty Bentley Watson; and two sons, James Lynwood Bentley, III and Samuel Jackson Bentley.

Bentley's father, James L. Bentley Sr., served in the Georgia State Legislature.
