= Travon Walker =

American football player (born 2000)

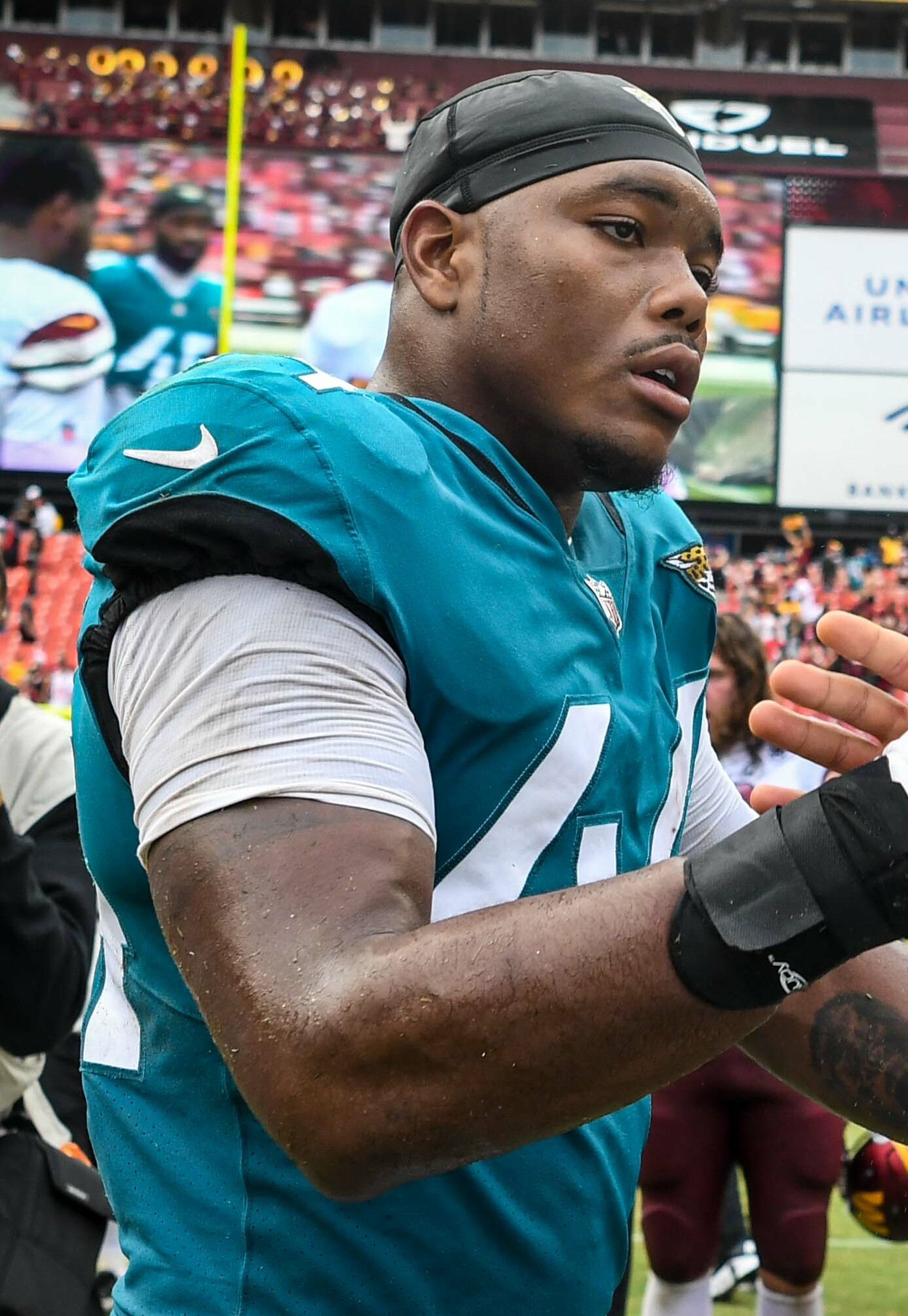
- Walker with the Jacksonville Jaguars in 2022

No. 44 – Jacksonville Jaguars
- Position: Defensive end
- Roster status: Active

Personal information
- Born: December 18, 2000 (age 25); Thomaston, Georgia, U.S.
- Listed height: 6 ft 5 in (1.96 m)
- Listed weight: 272 lb (123 kg)

Career information
- High school: Upson-Lee (Thomaston)
- College: Georgia (2019–2021)
- NFL draft: 2022: 1st round, 1st overall pick

Career history
- Jacksonville Jaguars (2022–present)

Awards and highlights
- CFP national champion (2021); Freshman All-SEC (2019)

Career NFL statistics as of Week 10, 2026
- Total tackles: 222
- Sacks: 30.5
- Forced fumbles: 3
- Fumble recoveries: 2
- Pass deflections: 9
- Interceptions: 1
- Defensive touchdowns: 1
- Stats at Pro Football Reference

Yury Travon Walker (TREY-von; born December 18, 2000) is an American professional football defensive end for the Jacksonville Jaguars of the National Football League (NFL). He played college football for the Georgia Bulldogs, winning the 2022 National Championship prior to being selected first overall by the Jaguars in the 2022 NFL draft.

== Early life ==
Walker was born on December 18, 2000, in Thomaston, Georgia, and attended Upson-Lee High School. He was selected to the 2019 All-American Bowl. He committed to play college football for the Georgia Bulldogs at the University of Georgia.

== College career ==
Walker played in 12 games and had 15 tackles and 2.5 sacks as a freshman for the Bulldogs in 2019. As a sophomore in 2020, he played in nine games with 13 tackles, one sack and one interception. Walker started at defensive tackle as a junior and was a part of the team that won the 2022 College Football Playoff National Championship. He declared for the 2022 NFL draft following the season.

== Professional career ==
=== Pre-draft ===
Pre-draft measurables
Height	Weight	Arm length	Hand span	Wingspan	40-yard dash	10-yard split	20-yard split	20-yard shuttle	Three-cone drill	Vertical jump	Broad jump	Wonderlic
6 ft 5 in (1.96 m)	272 lb (123 kg)	35 1/2 in (0.90 m)	10 3/4 in (0.27 m)	7 ft 0 1/4 in (2.14 m)	4.51 s	1.62 s	2.62 s	4.32 s	6.89 s	35.5 in (0.90 m)	10 ft 3 in (3.12 m)	11
All values from NFL Combine

Before the NFL Combine, Walker was projected to be selected in the ten to fifteen range in the 1st round. Walker was able to raise his draft stock with an impressive performance at the NFL Combine leading to many analysts, including Mel Kiper Jr., projecting him to be the first overall pick.

=== 2022 ===
Walker was selected first overall by the Jacksonville Jaguars in the 2022 NFL draft. He signed his four-year rookie contract, worth $37.4 million fully guaranteed, on May 12, 2022. In his debut, Walker recorded a sack and interception in a 28–22 loss against the Washington Commanders. In his rookie season, he started in 14 of the 15 games he appeared in. He finished with 3.5 sacks, 49 total tackles, one interception, two passes defended, and one forced fumble.

=== 2023 ===
During a Week 5 game against the Buffalo Bills, he recorded the first fumble recovery of his career. In a 26–0 win over the Carolina Panthers in Week 16, Walker recorded two sacks and six tackles, including two tackles for a loss. Walker finished the 2023 season with 52 tackles, ten sacks, two pass deflections, and a fumble recovery.

=== 2024 ===
In a Week 5 win over the Indianapolis Colts, Walker would record a career high three sacks and three tackles for loss along with five tackles and a forced fumble. Despite a bad year for the team, he would go on to have season highs in tackles, tackles for loss, sacks, and forced fumbles.

=== 2025 ===
On April 7, 2025, the Jaguars picked up the fifth-year option on Walker's contract. On September 29, Walker underwent left wrist surgery, causing him to miss the team's Week 5 game against the Kansas City Chiefs.

=== 2026 ===
On April 3, 2026, Walker signed a four-year, $110 million extension that would keep him with the Jaguars until the 2030 season.

== Career statistics ==
Legend
**Bold**	Career high

=== Regular season ===
Year	Team	Games		Tackles						Interceptions					Fumbles			
Year	Team	GP	GS	Cmb	Solo	Ast	Sck	TFL	Sfty	Int	Yds	Lng	TD	PD	FF	FR	Yds	TD
2022	JAX	15	14	49	24	25	3.5	5	0	**1**	**9**	**9**	0	**2**	1	0	0	0
2023	JAX	17	17	52	27	25	10.0	10	0	0	0	0	0	**2**	0	**1**	0	0
2024	JAX	17	17	**61**	**31**	**30**	**10.5**	**13**	0	0	0	0	0	1	**2**	**1**	**35**	**1**
2025	JAX	14	12	38	19	19	3.5	8	0	0	0	0	0	**2**	0	0	0	0
2026	JAX	9	9	22	10	12	3.0	5	0	0	0	0	0	2	0	0	0	0
Career		72	69	222	111	111	30.5	41	0	1	9	9	0	9	3	2	35	1

=== Postseason ===
Year	Team	Games		Tackles						Interceptions					Fumbles			
Year	Team	GP	GS	Cmb	Solo	Ast	Sck	TFL	Sfty	Int	Yds	Lng	TD	PD	FF	FR	Yds	TD
2022	JAX	2	2	**5**	2	**3**	**0.5**	**1**	0	0	0	0	0	**1**	0	0	0	0
2025	JAX	1	1	**5**	**3**	2	0.0	0	0	0	0	0	0	0	0	0	0	0
Career		3	3	10	5	5	0.5	1	0	0	0	0	0	1	0	0	0	0

=== College ===
Season	GP	Tackles					Interceptions					Fumbles		
Season	GP	Solo	Ast	Cmb	TfL	Sck	Int	Yds	Avg	TD	PD	FR	FF	TD
2019	12	9	6	15	3.5	2.5	0	0	0.0	0	1	**1**	0	0
2020	9	6	7	13	2.0	1.0	**1**	0	0.0	0	1	0	**1**	0
2021	15	**19**	**18**	**37**	**7.5**	**6.0**	0	0	0.0	0	**2**	**1**	0	0
Career	36	34	31	65	13	9.5	1	0	0.0	0	4	2	1	0
