= St. Mary A.M.E. Church =

Methodist church in Thomaston, Georgia, U.S.

- St. Mary A.M.E. Church
- 32.89633°N 84.32436°W
- Location: 605 N. Hightower Street; Thomaston, Georgia
- Country: United States
- Denomination: African Methodist Episcopal Church

History
- Founded: 1867

Architecture
- Years built: 1905 (121 years ago)

Clergy
- Pastor: Rev. Neisha Davis

St. Mary A.M.E. Church is a historic church for African Americans in Thomaston, Georgia, first congregated in 1867. The original church building was constructed in 1870 and William Harris brought in as the pastor, the third pastor serving the congregation. The church provided the community with its first school for African American students. In 1905, the current church building was constructed.
