= Atwater, Georgia =

Unincorporated community in Georgia, U.S.

Coordinates: 32°58′06″N 84°22′10″W

Atwater is an unincorporated community in Upson County, in the U.S. state of Georgia.

== History ==
A post office called Atwater was established in 1901, and remained in operation until 1907. The community was incorporated in 1902.
