= Upson County Courthouse =

- U.S. National Register of Historic Places
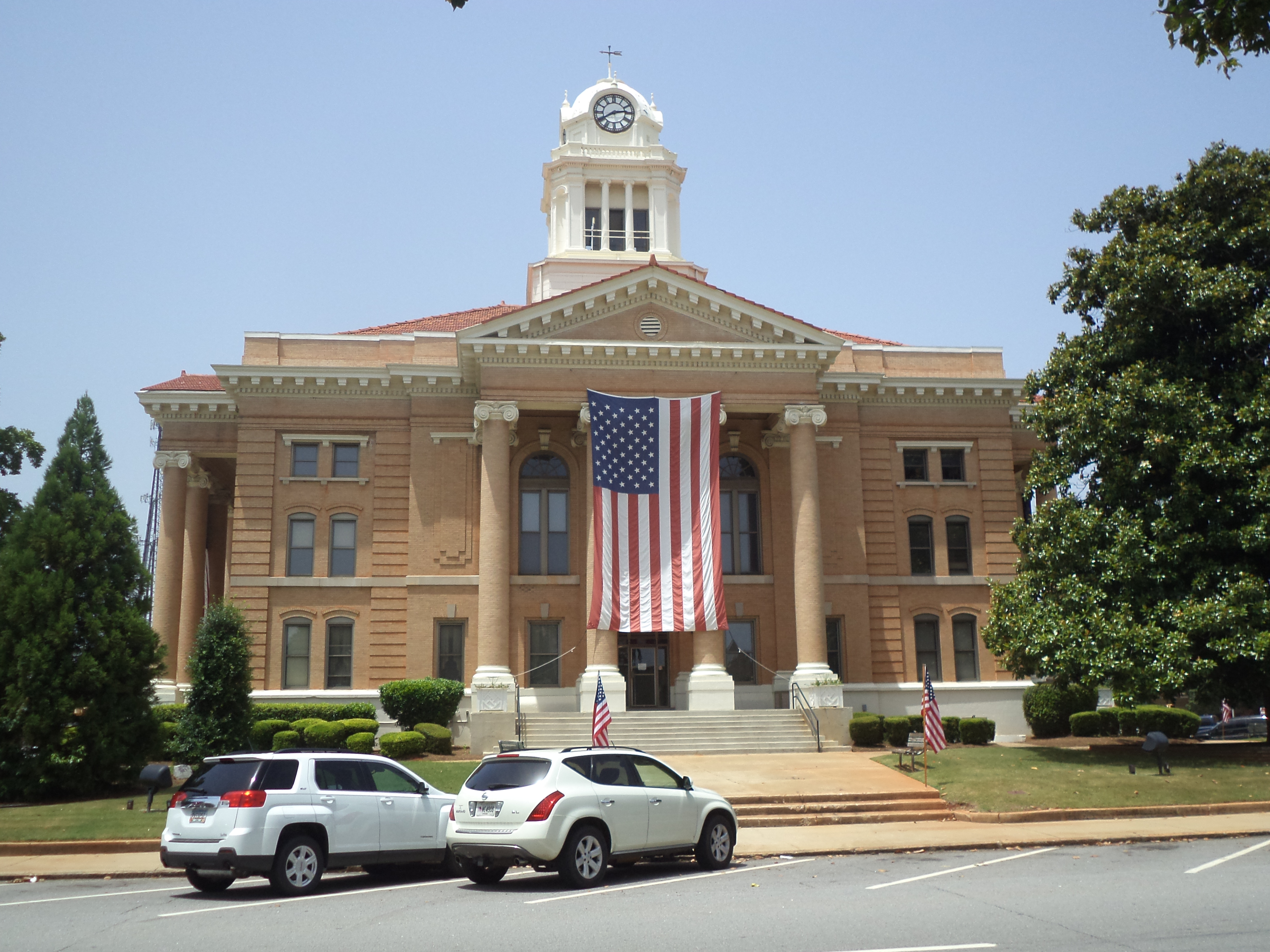

- Location within Georgia
- Interactive map showing the location of Upson County Courthouse
- Location: Courthouse Sq., Thomaston, Georgia
- Coordinates: 32°53′15″N 84°19′36″W
- Area: 1.5 acres (0.61 ha)
- Built: 1908
- Built by: Gude & Co.
- Architect: Milburn, Frank P.
- Architectural style: Classical Revival
- MPS: Georgia County Courthouses TR
- NRHP reference No.: 80001251
- Added to NRHP: September 18, 1980

Upson County Courthouse is a historic courthouse in Thomaston, Georgia, the county seat of Upson County, Georgia. It was built in 1908 at a cost of $50,000 in the Neoclassical style. It uses cream-colored brick and has Ionic brick columns with high bases. It has a three-stage clock tower. Segmental arched windows alternate with rectangular ones.

It was extensively renovated in 1968 and was added to the National Register of Historic Places on September 18, 1980. It is located in Courthouse Square.

== See also ==
- National Register of Historic Places listings in Upson County, Georgia
