= Elia Goode Byington =

American journalist (1858–1936)

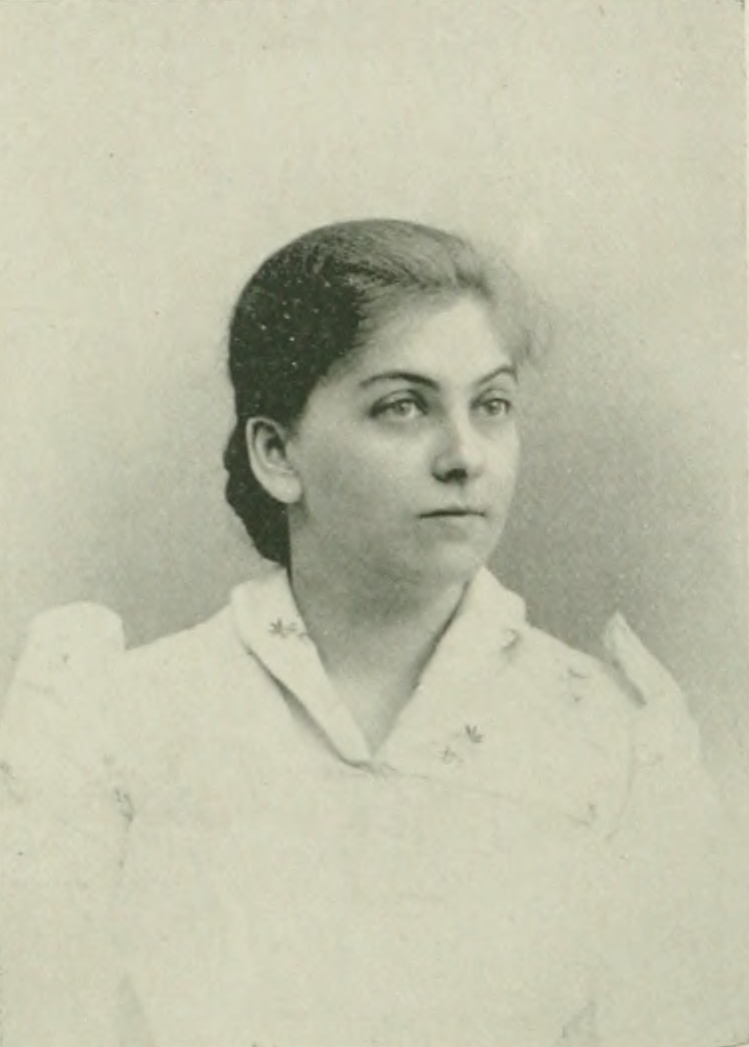
- Photo in A Woman of the Century
- Born: Elia Virginia Warren Goode; March 24, 1858; Thomaston, Georgia, U.S.
- Died: February 3, 1936 (aged 77)
- Resting place: Rose Hill Cemetery, Macon, Georgia, U.S.
- Education: Furlow Female College, Georgia Female College
- Occupation: Journalist
- Spouse: Edward Telfair Byington (m. 1877)
- Writing career
- Language: English

Elia Goode Byington (née, Goode; March 24, 1856/58 – February 3, 1936) was an American journalist from Georgia. With her husband, she was joint proprietor, editor, and manager of the Columbus Evening Ledger. Byington served as President of the Georgia Women's Press Club.

== Early life and education ==
Elia Virginia Warren Goode (Note: Familysearch.org records Elia's middle name as Virginia, while Davidson (2009) records it as Warren.) was born in Thomaston, Georgia, March 24, 1856/58. (Note: Familysearch.org records Elia's date of birth as March 24, 1856, while Willard & Livermore (1893) record it as March 24, 1858.) She came from a distinguished Georgia family, being the daughter of Col. Charles T. Goode, of Americus, and granddaughter of Gen. Eli Warren, of Perry.

Byington received her education in the Furlow Female College, in Americus and in the Georgia Female College in Madison.

== Career ==
Her father died when she was sixteen, leaving a large family and a limited income. Because of her knowledge of music, she became a teacher. After two years, in 1877, she married Edward Telfair Byington. Becoming interested in her husband's journalistic labors, she began to assist him with her writing. With her husband, she was joint proprietor, editor and manager of the Columbus Evening Ledger, a successful southern daily. She was interested in the intellectual and industrial progress of woman, and as such, with the exception of the carrier boys and four men for outdoor work, all of the employees of the Evening Ledger office were women. Byington also organized a Worker's Club as an aid to the many young girls who were burdened with southern conservatism.

Byington was president of the Woman's Press Club of Georgia, as well as secretary and treasurer of the Art Club, the leading social and literary organization of Columbus. She was also a member of the Daughters of the American Revolution, serving as Recording Secretary of the Oglethorpe Chapter of Columbus.

== Personal life ==
Byington lived in Georgia all her life. She died February 3, 1936, and is buried at Rose Hill Cemetery in Macon, Georgia.
