= Salem, Georgia =

- Unincorporated community Census-designated place
- Location in Upson County and the state of Georgia
- Coordinates: 32°44′55″N 84°11′56″W
- Country: United States
- State: Georgia
- County: Upson

Area
  - Total: 8.83 sq mi (22.88 km^{2})
  - Land: 8.83 sq mi (22.86 km^{2})
  - Water: 0.012 sq mi (0.03 km^{2})
- Elevation: 512 ft (156 m)

Population (2020)
  - Total: 307
  - Density: 34.8/sq mi (13.43/km^{2})
- Time zone: UTC-5 (Eastern (EST))
  - Summer (DST): UTC-4 (EDT)
- ZIP code: 31016
- Area code: 478
- FIPS code: 13-68129
- GNIS feature ID: 1852876

Salem is an unincorporated community and census-designated place (CDP) in Upson County, Georgia, United States. As of the 2020 census, Salem had a population of 307.

== Geography ==
Salem is located in southern Upson County at 32°44′55″N 84°11′56″W (32.748609, -84.198816).

The community is located along U.S. Route 80 and Georgia State Route 22 in the west central part of the state. U.S. 80 and GA-22 lead east 12 mi (19 km) to Roberta and west 24 mi (39 km) to Talbotton. Macon, the closest city with 50,000 people, is 39 mi (63 km) east via U.S. 80 and GA-22.

According to the United States Census Bureau, the CDP has a total area of 8.3 square miles (21 km^{2}), all land.

== Demographics ==
Historical population
Census	Pop.	Note	%±
2000	339		—
2010	310		−8.6%
2020	307		−1.0%
U.S. Decennial Census; 1850-1870 1870-1880; 1890-1910 1920-1930; 1940 1950 1960; 1970 1980 1990; 2000 2010 2020

Salem first appeared as a census designated place in the 2000 U.S. census.

=== Racial and ethnic composition ===
Salem CDP, Georgia – Racial and ethnic composition Note: the US Census treats Hispanic/Latino as an ethnic category. This table excludes Latinos from the racial categories and assigns them to a separate category. Hispanics/Latinos may be of any race.
Race / Ethnicity (NH = Non-Hispanic)	Pop 2000	Pop 2010	Pop 2020	% 2000	% 2010	% 2020
White alone (NH)	10	5	24	2.95%	1.61%	7.82%
Black or African American alone (NH)	325	302	274	95.87%	97.42%	89.25%
Native American or Alaska Native alone (NH)	1	1	0	0.29%	0.32%	0.00%
Asian alone (NH)	0	0	0	0.00%	0.00%	0.00%
Native Hawaiian or Pacific Islander alone (NH)	0	0	0	0.00%	0.00%	0.00%
Other race alone (NH)	0	1	0	0.00%	0.32%	0.00%
Mixed race or Multiracial (NH)	0	0	6	0.00%	0.00%	1.95%
Hispanic or Latino (any race)	3	1	3	0.88%	0.32%	0.98%
Total	339	310	307	100.00%	100.00%	100.00%

=== 2010 census ===
As of the 2010 census Salem had a population of 310. The racial and ethnic makeup of the population was 97.4% non-Hispanic black, 0.3% Hispanic black (1 person, also the only Hispanic), 1.6% non-Hispanic white (5 people), 0.3% Native American and 0.3% non-Hispanic reporting some other race.

As of the census of 2000, there were 339 people, 124 households, and 94 families residing in the CDP. The population density was 40.7 inhabitants per square mile (15.7/km^{2}). There were 135 housing units at an average density of 16.2/sq mi (6.3/km^{2}). The racial makeup of the CDP was 2.95% White, 96.76% African American and 0.29% Native American. Hispanic or Latino of any race were 0.88% of the population.

There were 124 households, out of which 37.1% had children under the age of 18 living with them, 43.5% were married couples living together, 25.8% had a female householder with no husband present, and 23.4% were non-families. 21.0% of all households were made up of individuals, and 9.7% had someone living alone who was 65 years of age or older. The average household size was 2.73 and the average family size was 3.17.

In the CDP, the population was spread out, with 23.9% under the age of 18, 11.2% from 18 to 24, 30.1% from 25 to 44, 26.0% from 45 to 64, and 8.8% who were 65 years of age or older. The median age was 36 years. For every 100 females, there were 86.3 males. For every 100 females age 18 and over, there were 83.0 males.

The median income for a household in the CDP was $28,036, and the median income for a family was $22,788. Males had a median income of $22,143 versus $13,500 for females. The per capita income for the CDP was $12,591. About 16.0% of families and 15.5% of the population were below the poverty line, including 20.0% of those under age 18 and none of those age 65 or over.
