= Upson-Lee High School =

Secondary school in Thomaston, Georgia, United States

Coordinates: 32.897°N 84.300°W

Location
- 268 Knight Trail; Thomaston, Georgia 30286; United States

Information
- Type: Public high school
- Established: 1992
- School district: Thomaston-Upson County School District
- Principal: Ricky English
- Teaching staff: 78.80 (FTE)
- Grades: 9–12
- Enrollment: 1,202 (2023–2024)
- Student to teacher ratio: 15.25
- Campus: Suburban
- Colors: Purple, silver and black
- Mascot: Knight
- Newspaper: The Sword and Shield
- Website: https://ulhs.upson.k12.ga.us/

Upson-Lee High School is a secondary school in Thomaston, Georgia, United States. It is the only high school in Upson County. It is a combination of the former R. E. Lee Institute and Upson High School, both previously located in Upson County. Upson-Lee High School serves 1284 students with a diverse and challenging selection of academic and elective courses, Advanced Placement and honors programs, sixteen CTAE (Career, Technical and Agriculture Education) pathways, Navy JROTC, and dual enrollment with Gordon State College and Southern Crescent Technical College. The school offers eighteen varsity sports along with academic teams and clubs.

== Facilities ==
The Thomaston-Upson Board of Education has a Fine Arts Center located on the south side of the school and just east of the parking lots.

== Notable alumni ==
- James L. Bentley - former Comptroller General of Georgia
- Coy Bowles - guitarist of Zac Brown Band
- Wayne Cochran - soul singer
- Frank Gordy - founder of The Varsity restaurant chain
- Michael Hicks - former NFL running back
- John Holliman - broadcast journalist
- Ken Johnson - former NFL defensive back
- Phil Jones - former high school and college football coach
- Marion Montgomery - poet
- Martha B. Hudson Pennyman - Olympic athlete
- Travon Walker - Jacksonville Jaguars defensive end
