= Marion Montgomery (poet) =

American writer

Marion Montgomery (April 16, 1925 – November 23, 2011) was an American poet, novelist, educator, and critic. For more than 30 years he was a professor of English at the University of Georgia.

== Early years and education ==
Marion Hoyt Montgomery was born in Thomaston, Georgia. After service in the United States Army from 1943 to 1946, he married Dorothy Carlisle in 1951. They had five children. He received his A.B. and M.A. from the University of Georgia in 1950 and 1953 respectively and did postgraduate work in creative writing at the University of Iowa (1956–58).

== Published works ==
=== Novels ===
Montgomery published three novels, all of which focus on conflicts between the Old and the New South. When he published his first novel, The Wandering of Desire (1962), Flannery O'Connor wrote him a letter that later became famous. She wrote, "The Southern writer can outwrite anybody in the country because he has the Bible and a little history. You have more than your share of both and a splendid gift besides." His second novel, Darrell, was published in 1964, and — in the words of his literary executor and former student Dr. Michael Jordan — "combines comedy, satire, and tragedy in its depiction of the misadventures of a country-born boy and his grandmother as they attempt to adjust to life in an Athens neighborhood. Darrell's longing for an even more exciting life in Atlanta is counterbalanced by his grandmother's common sense and longing for the country." His most ambitious novel is 1974's Fugitive. It is an overt dramatization of the ideas that were at the center of the Fugitive/Agrarian movement. In that novel, successful country music songwriter Walt Mason, disillusioned with life in Nashville, Tennessee, moves to rural Georgia to become a gentleman farmer, only to find out that such a life can't be "poured in from the top," but must spring up from the roots.

=== Short stories ===
Several of Montgomery's dozen or so published short stories have been included in best-of anthologies. I Got a Gal and The Decline and Fall of Officer Fergerson appeared in Southern Writing in the Sixties (1966) and The Best American Short Stories: 1971, respectively. His books of poetry include Dry Lightning (1960), Stones from the Rubble (1965), and The Gull and Other Georgia Scenes (1969). He also was a columnist for the now-defunct weekly Athens (Ga.) Observer.

=== Poetry and social criticism ===
Though he published extensively as a poet and novelist, he is remembered as a literary and social critic. Born the same year as Flannery O'Connor, Montgomery was her friend and has become perhaps her most insightful interpreter. He often pointed out that he, like O'Connor, was a "Hillbilly Thomist," and it is that Catholic worldview that permeates his own work and allowed him particular insights into both O'Connor and another great subject of his work, Walker Percy. He was perhaps the leading figure in what some have called the "second generation" of Fugitive/Agrarian writers — writers who, like O'Connor herself, were too young to be the contemporaries of those such as Andrew Nelson Lytle, Allen Tate, John Crowe Ransom, and Robert Penn Warren, but who shared many of their literary and intellectual sensibilities.

== Death ==
Montgomery died in Crawford, Georgia at the age of eighty-six.
