= 1970 Georgia gubernatorial election =

- November 3, 1970
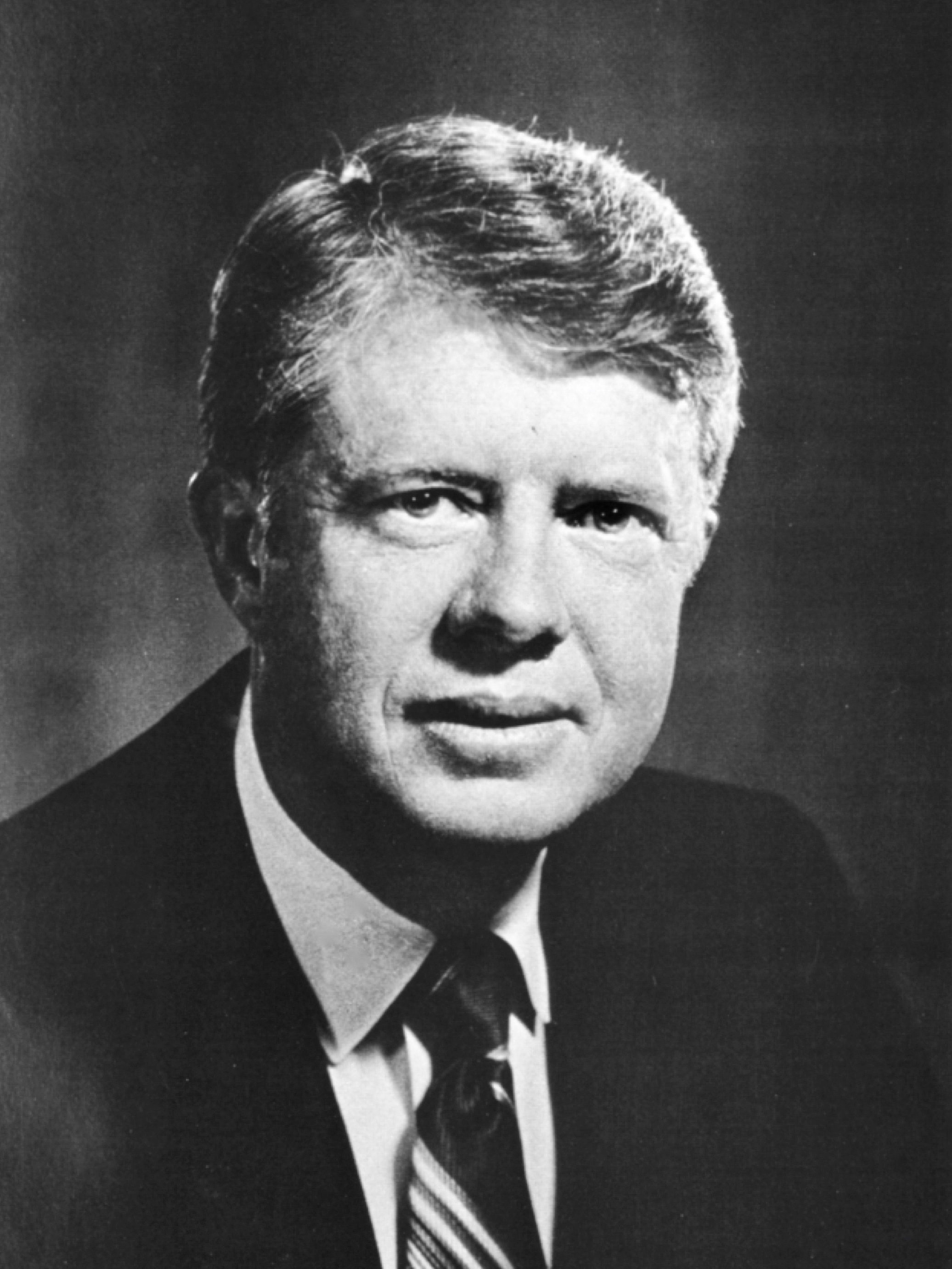

Nominee	Jimmy Carter	Hal Suit
Party	Democratic	Republican
Popular vote	620,419	424,983
Percentage	59.35%	40.65%
- County results Carter: 50–60% 60–70% 70–80% 80–90% >90% Suit: 50–60% 60–70%
Governor before election
Lester Maddox
Democratic
Elected Governor
Jimmy Carter
Democratic

The 1970 Georgia gubernatorial election was held in the U.S. state on November 3, 1970. It was marked by the election as Governor of Georgia of the relatively little-known former state senator Jimmy Carter after a hard battle in the Democratic primary. This election is famous because Carter, who was often regarded as one of the New South Governors, later ran for president in 1976 on his gubernatorial record and won. As of 2026, this was the last time Fulton County was carried by the Republican candidate in a gubernatorial election, the only time it failed to back Carter, and the last time a Democrat in any race won without carrying it. It is also the last time that Clarke County voted for the Republican candidate for governor.

== Background ==
Under the Georgia constitution of 1945, incumbent Democratic governor Lester Maddox was prohibited from seeking re-election.

== Democratic primary ==
Initially the strongest candidate was former governor Carl E. Sanders. Sanders was a moderate, who worked to improve education, the environment and led the transition away from racial segregation with cooperation with the United States Federal Government. He left office at the peak of his popularity.

His main opponent was former state senator and candidate for the gubernatorial nomination in 1966 Jimmy Carter.

=== Candidates ===
==== Nominee ====
- Jimmy Carter, former state senator (1963–1967) and candidate for governor in 1966

==== Eliminated in runoff ====
- Carl Sanders, former governor (1963–1967)

==== Eliminated in primary ====
- McKee Hargett
- Thomas J. Irwin
- Chevene Bowers King, founder of the Albany Movement and candidate for state representative in 1964
- Adam B. Matthews
- J. B. Stoner, white supremacist

=== Democratic primary election results ===
Democratic primary results
Party	Candidate	Votes	%
Democratic	Jimmy Carter	388,280	48.62
Democratic	Carl Sanders	301,659	37.77
Democratic	Chevene Bowers King	70,424	8.82
Democratic	J. B. Stoner	17,663	2.21
Democratic	McKee Hargett	9,440	1.18
Democratic	Thomas J. Irwin	4,184	0.52
Democratic	Adam B. Matthews	3,332	0.42

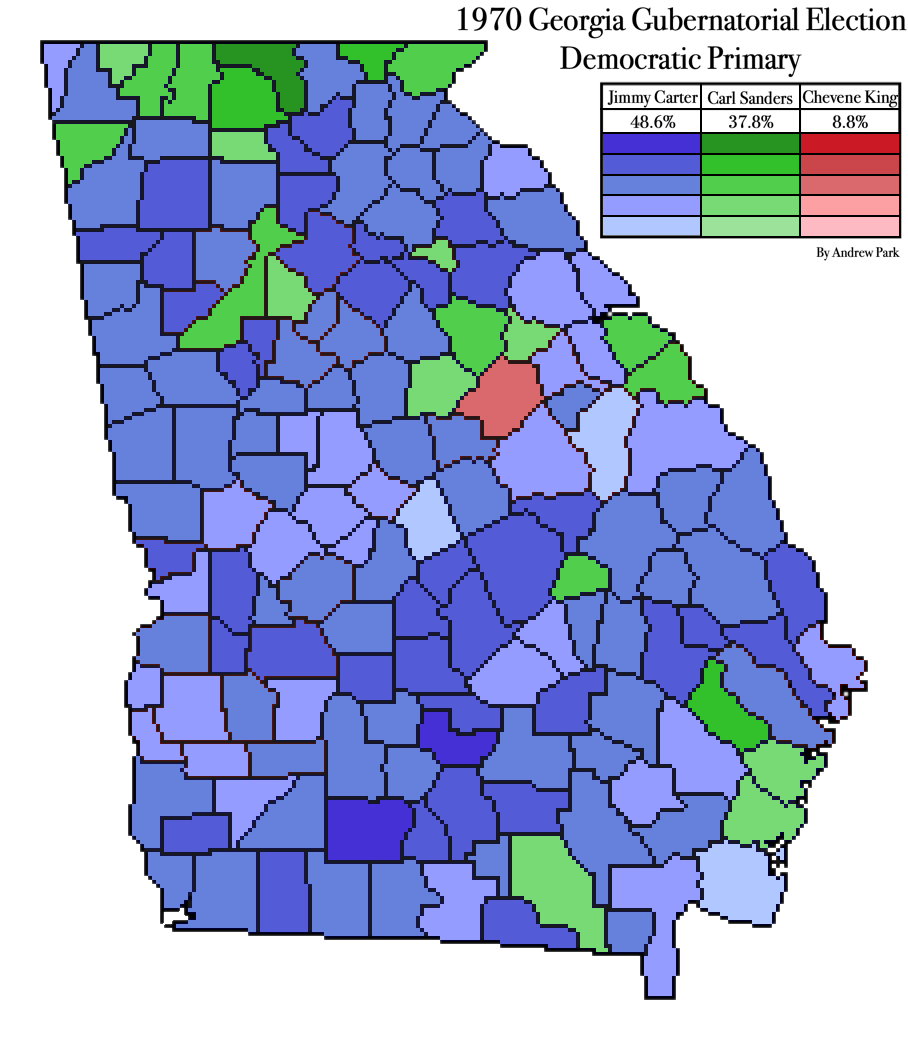

=== Runoff ===
A runoff was held on September 23. Despite Sanders's initial front-runner status and popularity, Carter won by nearly 20 points.

Democratic runoff results
Party	Candidate	Votes	%
Democratic	Jimmy Carter	506,462	59.42
Democratic	Carl Sanders	345,906	40.58

=== Lieutenant governor ===
Governor Maddox ran for lieutenant governor and won the nomination. Although Maddox was elected as a Democratic candidate at the same time as Jimmy Carter's election as governor as a Democratic candidate, the two were not running mates; in Georgia, particularly in that era of Democratic dominance, the winners of the primary elections went on to easy victories in the general elections without campaigning together as an official ticket or as running mates.

== Republican primary ==
At this time, Georgia was still regarded as a part of the Democratic Party's Solid South, despite the Republican plurality in the 1966 gubernatorial race. The Democratic position in 1970 was again regarded as safe. TV newsman Hal Suit faced Comptroller James L. Bentley, who had been elected as a Democrat but joined the Republican party in 1968.

=== Candidates ===
==== Nominee ====
- Hal Suit, TV news presenter

==== Eliminated in the primary ====
- James L. Bentley, comptroller of Georgia (1963–1971)

=== Republican primary ===
Republican primary results
Party	Candidate	Votes	%
Republican	Hal Suit	62,868	60.97
Republican	James L. Bentley	40,251	39.03

== General election ==
Carter ran on a populist platform. While he refused to join the segregationist White Citizens' Council, he ran a campaign specifically designed to win over the segregationist vote that had made Maddox governor four years earlier.

In winning the governorship back in 1970, he courted the right wing, particularly the large constituency of Lester Maddox, the fiery segregationist Governor ... At one point, he called Mr. Maddox "the essence of the Democratic Party" and added that he was "proud" to be on the ticket with him.

Carter's true feelings about race might be better indicated by the fact that his had been one of only two families which voted to admit blacks to the Plains Baptist Church, but that was not something advertised in the 1970 race for governor.

=== Results ===
Carter won the governorship easily.

General election results
Party	Candidate	Votes	%	±%
Democratic	Jimmy Carter	620,419	59.28%	
Republican	Hal Suit	424,983	40.60%	

== Controversy ==
=== Civil rights ===
Prior to this campaign, Jimmy Carter appeared to be a proponent of civil rights and desegregation. In 1954 he refused to join the White Citizens Council despite immense pressure and went on to vote against segregation for his church in 1965. However, after failing to run as a moderate in the Georgia Gubernatorial Election of 1966, Carter's new strategy in 1970 was designed to attract the pro-segregationist vote. Poll data suggested that the appearance of a pro-segregationist position could be critical to winning the race, even if it was never overtly stated. In order to shore up segregationist support, Carter made overtures to numerous racial organizations, and even personally called the cofounder of the White Citizens Council. Carter's apparent support for segregation sparked animosity with his opponent Carl Sanders. Sanders claims that when his own campaign had presented the same poll data, he refused to pursue a strategy on it for moral reasons. Furthermore, Carter's campaign printed numerous pamphlets insinuating Sanders was too "chummy" with Black Americans.

Ultimately, Carter himself has expressed embarrassment and regret over his strategy. After being elected, he reversed his position on segregation prominently, stating in his 1971 gubernatorial inaugural address "The time for racial discrimination is over." Though attendees could be heard booing, this declaration was hardly controversial even for a Southern governor, as many had already made similar statements by that time.

Carter won praise for his strategy from Leroy Johnson, who stated "I understand why he ran that kind of ultra-conservative campaign. You have to do that to win. And that is the main thing. I don't believe you can win [Georgia] without being a racist."
