= Hal Suit =

American television personality and politician (1922–1994)

- Born: Harold Columbus Suit; April 1, 1922; Youngstown, Ohio, U.S.
- Died: November 20, 1994 (aged 72); Kennesaw, Georgia, U.S.
- Education: University of Florida; Rollins College
- Occupations: Broadcaster; Politician
- Political party: Republican
- Children: 4

Harold Columbus "Hal" Suit (April 1, 1922 – November 20, 1994) was an American local television news personality and political figure who won the 1970 Republican nomination for Governor of Georgia but lost the November general election to future U.S. President Jimmy Carter.

A native of Youngstown, Ohio, and styling himself as a "Taft Republican", Suit had Southern ancestry, as both his parents were born in North Carolina. A 19-year-old college student in 1941 at the time of the Japanese attack on Pearl Harbor, he studied history and political science at the University of Florida at Gainesville, Florida and later studied at Rollins College in Winter Park, Florida. During the remaining years of World War II, he served in the United States Army, was twice wounded and decorated for valor with a Silver Star, and two Bronze Stars. He lost a leg in the war on October 11, 1944, in Germany.

Upon leaving the military, he became, in 1947, a radio news announcer. In 1954, he moved to Albany, Georgia, where he was part of the founding staff of the city's first, and sole VHF television station, WALB-TV, which began broadcasting on April 7, 1954. After five years, Suit moved to WSB-TV in Atlanta, the state's first television station, which first went on the air in September 1948. Gaining recognition in a major media market as a top local anchorman, political editorialist and news executive, he received the 1967 National Headliner Award. During that period, WSB-TV was affiliated with NBC, and Suit became known to a national audience by doing frequent reports from the South for the network's news broadcasts.

In 1970, Suit was named his state's most outstanding citizen by Georgia's Toastmasters. That year, according to The New York Times, his picture was identified by 91 percent of registered voters who watched WSB, the station described as "the most powerful and influential in Georgia".

In 1970, Suit, an opponent of capital punishment, was an upset winner in the Republican gubernatorial primary over the Democrat-turned-Republican state Comptroller General James L. Bentley, who carried the backing of the 1966 nominee, former U.S. Representative Howard Callaway but had backed Callaway's opponent, Democrat Lester Maddox in the previous deadlocked contest. In a measure of just how little infrastructure existed in the Georgia Republican Party at the time, 107,555 votes were cast in the first-ever Republican gubernatorial primary held in Georgia, but the Democratic turnout surpassed 798,000. Additionally, fewer than a hundred Republican ballots were cast in ninety-nine counties, and fewer than ten votes were tabulated in eight other counties. The Republican vote came mostly in urban areas favorable to Suit but at the expense of Bentley. Four years later in 1974, the Georgia Republican primary turnout barely exceeded 22,000.

Suit subsequently lost the general election to Carter, 424,983 (40.6 percent) to 620,419 (59.3 percent).

Thereafter, Suit became president of the Atlanta-based communications company, Production 70's, through which he continued to deliver opinion pieces on radio and in newspapers. In 1972, Suit announced that he would run again for governor in 1974. However, he did not get the nomination.

Hal Suit and his wife were longtime residents of the Atlanta suburb of Kennesaw, where they reared four children. He died there at the age of seventy-two.

== See also ==
- 1970 Georgia gubernatorial election

Party political offices
Preceded by Bo Callaway	Republican nominee for Governor of Georgia; 1970	Succeeded by Ronnie Thompson
