= WKEU (AM) =

- Griffin, Georgia; United States
- Broadcast area: south metro Atlanta
- Frequency: 1450 kHz
- Branding: The Rock

Programming
- Format: Oldies
- Affiliations: ABC Radio, Westwood One

Ownership
- Owner: Wlt & Associates
- Sister stations: WKEU-FM 88.9

History
- First air date: 1933

Technical information
- Licensing authority: FCC
- Facility ID: 16783
- Class: C
- Power: 1,000 watts day/night
- Transmitter coordinates: 33°14′24.00″N 84°14′55.00″W

Links
- Public license information: Public file; LMS
- Webcast: Listen Live
- Website: wkeuradio.com

WKEU AM 1450 is a radio station broadcasting an oldies format. Licensed to serve Griffin, Georgia, United States, it serves the south metro Atlanta area. The station is currently owned by Wlt & Associates, and features programming from ABC Radio and Westwood One.

The station is an affiliate of the Atlanta Braves radio network, the largest radio affiliate network in Major League Baseball.

== History ==
WKEU became an affiliate of the Mutual Broadcasting System on March 15, 1944.
