= Stephen Upson =

American politician and lawyer (1785–1824)

Stephen Upson (1785 – August 24, 1824) was an American politician and lawyer.

Upson was born in Waterbury, Connecticut, and graduated from Yale College in 1804. He then studied law at the Litchfield Law School. In 1807, Upson, moved to Hoover, Virginia, and later to Lexington, Georgia, in order to study law under William H. Crawford. In 1812, Upson married Hannah Cummins. He represented Oglethorpe County, Georgia, in the Georgia General Assembly beginning in 1820 and continued in that role until his death. Upson was also the head of the Georgia bar.

Upson died in 1824 and was buried in the Presbyterian Cemetery in Lexington. On December 15, 1824, the Georgia General Assembly created Upson County and named it in his honor.
