= Hannahs Mill, Georgia =

- Unincorporated community Census-designated place
- Location in Upson County and the state of Georgia
- Coordinates: 32°56′8″N 84°20′17″W
- Country: United States
- State: Georgia
- County: Upson

Area
  - Total: 4.36 sq mi (11.28 km^{2})
  - Land: 4.32 sq mi (11.19 km^{2})
  - Water: 0.035 sq mi (0.09 km^{2})
- Elevation: 748 ft (228 m)

Population (2020)
  - Total: 3,121
  - Density: 722.5/sq mi (278.96/km^{2})
- Time zone: UTC-5 (Eastern (EST))
  - Summer (DST): UTC-4 (EDT)
- ZIP code: 30286
- Area code: 706
- FIPS code: 13-36416
- GNIS feature ID: 0331907

Hannahs Mill is an unincorporated community and census-designated place (CDP) in Upson County, Georgia, United States. As of the 2020 census, Hannahs Mill had a population of 3,121.

== Geography ==
Hannahs Mill is located at 32°56′08″N 84°20′17″W.

According to the United States Census Bureau, the CDP has a total area of 4.4 square miles (11 km^{2}), of which 4.4 square miles (11 km^{2}) is land and 0.23% is water.

== Demographics ==
Historical population
| Census | Pop. | Note | %± |
|---|---|---|---|
| 1980 | 2,616 | | — |
| 2000 | 3,267 | | — |
| 2010 | 3,298 | | 0.9% |
| 2020 | 3,121 | | −5.4% |
U.S. Decennial Census; 1850-1870 1870-1880; 1890-1910 1920-1930; 1940 1950 1960; 1970 1980 1990; 2000 2010 2020

Hannahs Mills first appeared as a census designated place in the 1980 U.S. census. It was not listed in the 1990 U.S. census after a portion of the CDP was annexed to Thomaston. It reappeared as a CDP in the 2000 U.S. census.

=== Racial and ethnic composition ===
Hannahs Mill, Georgia – Racial and ethnic composition Note: the US Census treats Hispanic/Latino as an ethnic category. This table excludes Latinos from the racial categories and assigns them to a separate category. Hispanics/Latinos may be of any race.
| Race / Ethnicity (NH = Non-Hispanic) | Pop 2000 | Pop 2010 | Pop 2020 | % 2000 | % 2010 | % 2020 |
|---|---|---|---|---|---|---|
| White alone (NH) | 2,950 | 2,800 | 2,540 | 90.30% | 84.90% | 81.38% |
| Black or African American alone (NH) | 209 | 328 | 324 | 6.40% | 9.95% | 10.38% |
| Native American or Alaska Native alone (NH) | 16 | 5 | 4 | 0.49% | 0.15% | 0.13% |
| Asian alone (NH) | 26 | 22 | 53 | 0.80% | 0.67% | 1.70% |
| Pacific Islander alone (NH) | 0 | 0 | 0 | 0.00% | 0.00% | 0.00% |
| Some Other Race alone (NH) | 0 | 2 | 3 | 0.00% | 0.06% | 0.10% |
| Mixed race or Multiracial (NH) | 19 | 45 | 106 | 0.58% | 1.36% | 3.40% |
| Hispanic or Latino (any race) | 47 | 96 | 91 | 1.44% | 2.91% | 2.92% |
| Total | 3,267 | 3,298 | 3,121 | 100.00% | 100.00% | 100.00% |

=== 2020 census ===
As of the 2020 census, Hannahs Mill had a population of 3,121. The median age was 43.4 years. 21.2% of residents were under the age of 18 and 20.5% were 65 years of age or older. For every 100 females there were 90.3 males, and for every 100 females age 18 and over there were 89.4 males age 18 and over.

77.6% of residents lived in urban areas, while 22.4% lived in rural areas.

There were 1,212 households, of which 29.9% had children under the age of 18 living in them. Of all households, 46.5% were married-couple households, 16.9% were households with a male householder and no spouse or partner present, and 29.5% were households with a female householder and no spouse or partner present. About 26.9% of all households were made up of individuals, and 12.1% had someone living alone who was 65 years of age or older.

There were 1,299 housing units, of which 6.7% were vacant. The homeowner vacancy rate was 0.8% and the rental vacancy rate was 4.6%.
