= Yatesville, Georgia =

- Town
- Nickname: The Red Dirt City
- Location in Upson County and the state of Georgia
- Coordinates: 32°54′46″N 84°8′33″W
- Country: United States
- State: Georgia
- County: Upson

Area
  - Total: 0.88 sq mi (2.27 km^{2})
  - Land: 0.86 sq mi (2.24 km^{2})
  - Water: 0.012 sq mi (0.03 km^{2})
- Elevation: 797 ft (243 m)

Population (2020)
  - Total: 394
  - Density: 456.4/sq mi (176.21/km^{2})
- Time zone: UTC-5 (Eastern (EST))
  - Summer (DST): UTC-4 (EDT)
- ZIP code: 31097
- Area code: 706
- FIPS code: 13-84708
- GNIS feature ID: 0325604

Yatesville is a town in Upson County, Georgia, United States. As of the 2020 census, Yatesville had a population of 394.

== History ==
Yatesville was founded in 1888 when the railroad was extended to that point, and named after A.J. Yates, a first settler. The Georgia General Assembly incorporated Yatesville as a town in 1896.

== Geography ==
Yatesville is located at 32°54′46″N 84°8′33″W (32.912663, -84.142393).

The town is located along Georgia State Route 74, which runs from west to east through the center of town. GA-74 leads east 35 mi (56 km) to Macon and west 12 mi (19 km) to Thomaston, the Upson County seat.

According to the United States Census Bureau, the town has a total area of 0.9 square miles (2.3 km^{2}), of which 0.9 square miles (2.3 km^{2}) is land and 1.14% is water.

== Demographics ==
Historical population
| Census | Pop. | Note | %± |
|---|---|---|---|
| 1900 | 283 | | — |
| 1910 | 366 | | 29.3% |
| 1920 | 400 | | 9.3% |
| 1930 | 281 | | −29.7% |
| 1940 | 240 | | −14.6% |
| 1950 | 290 | | 20.8% |
| 1960 | 354 | | 22.1% |
| 1970 | 423 | | 19.5% |
| 1980 | 390 | | −7.8% |
| 1990 | 409 | | 4.9% |
| 2000 | 408 | | −0.2% |
| 2010 | 357 | | −12.5% |
| 2020 | 394 | | 10.4% |
U.S. Decennial Census; 1850-1870 1880; 1890-1910 1920-1930; 1930-1940 1940-1950; 1960-1980 1990

As of the census of 2000, there were 408 people, 158 households and 124 families residing in the town. The population density was 465.0 inhabitants per square mile (179.5/km^{2}). There were 175 housing units at an average density of 199.5 per square mile (77.0/km^{2}). The racial makeup of the town was 75.74% White, 23.77% African American, 0.25% Native American, 0.25% from other races. Hispanic or Latino of any race were 0.74% of the population.

There were 159 households, out of which 30.8% had children under the age of 18 living with them, 58.5% were married couples living together, 11.9% had a female householder with no husband present, and 22.0% were non-families. 19.5% of all households were made up of individuals, and 11.3% had someone living alone who was 65 years of age or older. The average household size was 2.57 and the average family size was 2.91.

In the town, the population was spread out, with 21.8% under the age of 18, 9.1% from 18 to 24, 29.2% from 25 to 44, 22.5% from 45 to 64, and 17.4% who were 65 years of age or older. The median age was 39 years. For every 100 females, there were 90.7 males. For every 100 females age 18 and over, there were 87.6 males.

The median income for a household in the town was $38,750, and the median income for a family was $38,500. Males had a median income of $30,096 versus $25,500 for females. The per capita income for the town was $21,762. About 9.2% of families and 9.4% of the population were below the poverty line, including 16.5% of those under age 18 and none of those age 65 or over.
