= Thomaston, Georgia =

City of Thomaston
- City
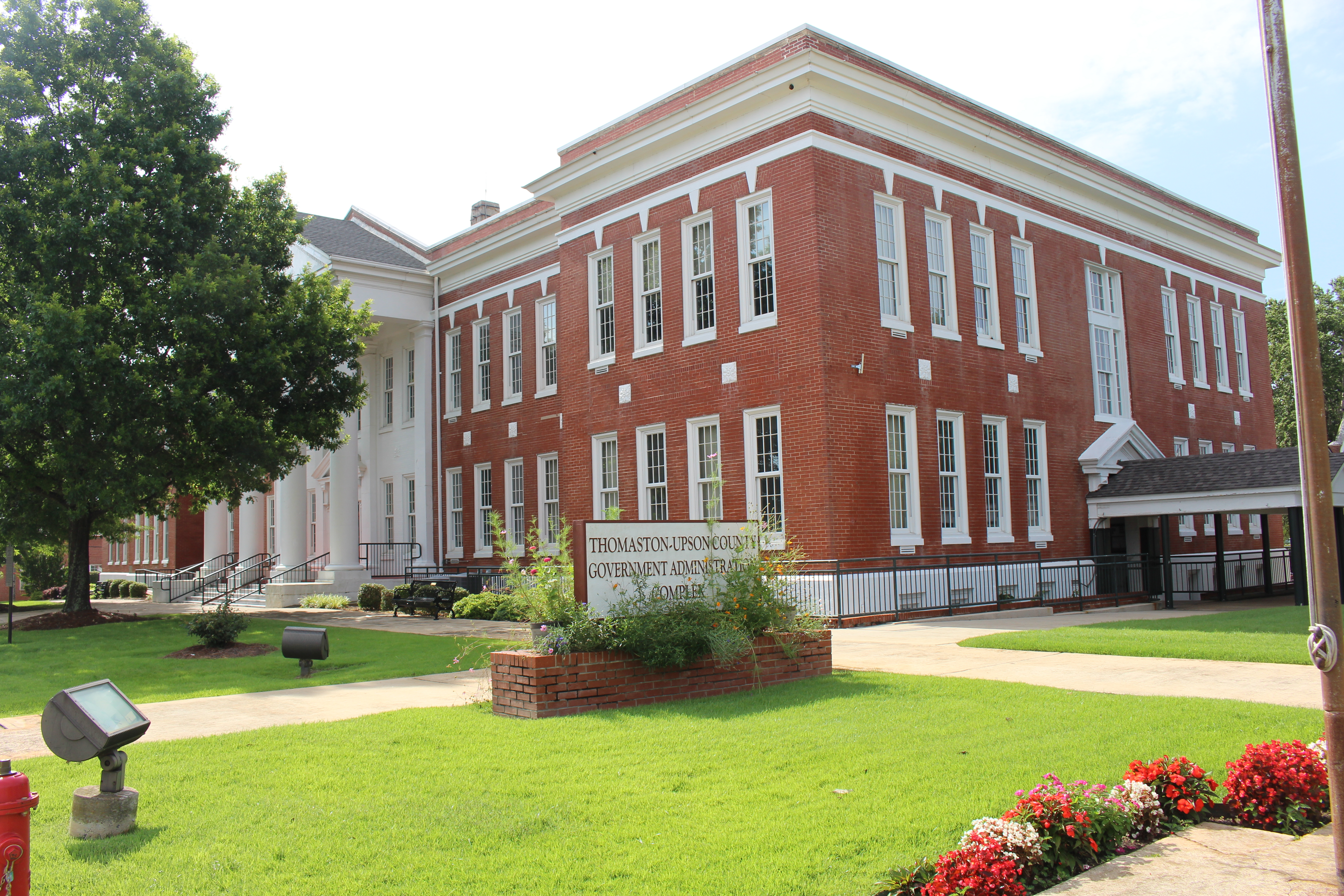
- Thomaston-Upson County Government Administration Complex

- Flag Seal Logo
- Motto: "One of the Best 100 Towns"
- Location in Upson County and the state of Georgia.
- Coordinates: 32°54′N 84°20′W
- Country: United States
- State: Georgia
- County: Upson

Area
  - Total: 9.75 sq mi (25.24 km^{2})
  - Land: 9.54 sq mi (24.71 km^{2})
  - Water: 0.20 sq mi (0.53 km^{2})
- Elevation: 784 ft (239 m)

Population (2020)
  - Total: 9,816
  - Density: 1,029.1/sq mi (397.32/km^{2})
- Time zone: UTC-5 (Eastern (EST))
  - Summer (DST): UTC-4 (EDT)
- ZIP code: 30286
- Area code: 706
- FIPS code: 13-76168
- GNIS feature ID: 0324093
- Website: Official City of Thomaston, Georgia Government Website

Thomaston is a city in and the county seat of Upson County, Georgia, United States. The population was 9,816 at the 2020 census. It is the principal city of and is included in the Thomaston, Georgia Micropolitan Statistical Area, which is included in the Atlanta - Sandy Springs (GA) - Gainesville (GA) - Alabama (partial) CSA.

== History ==
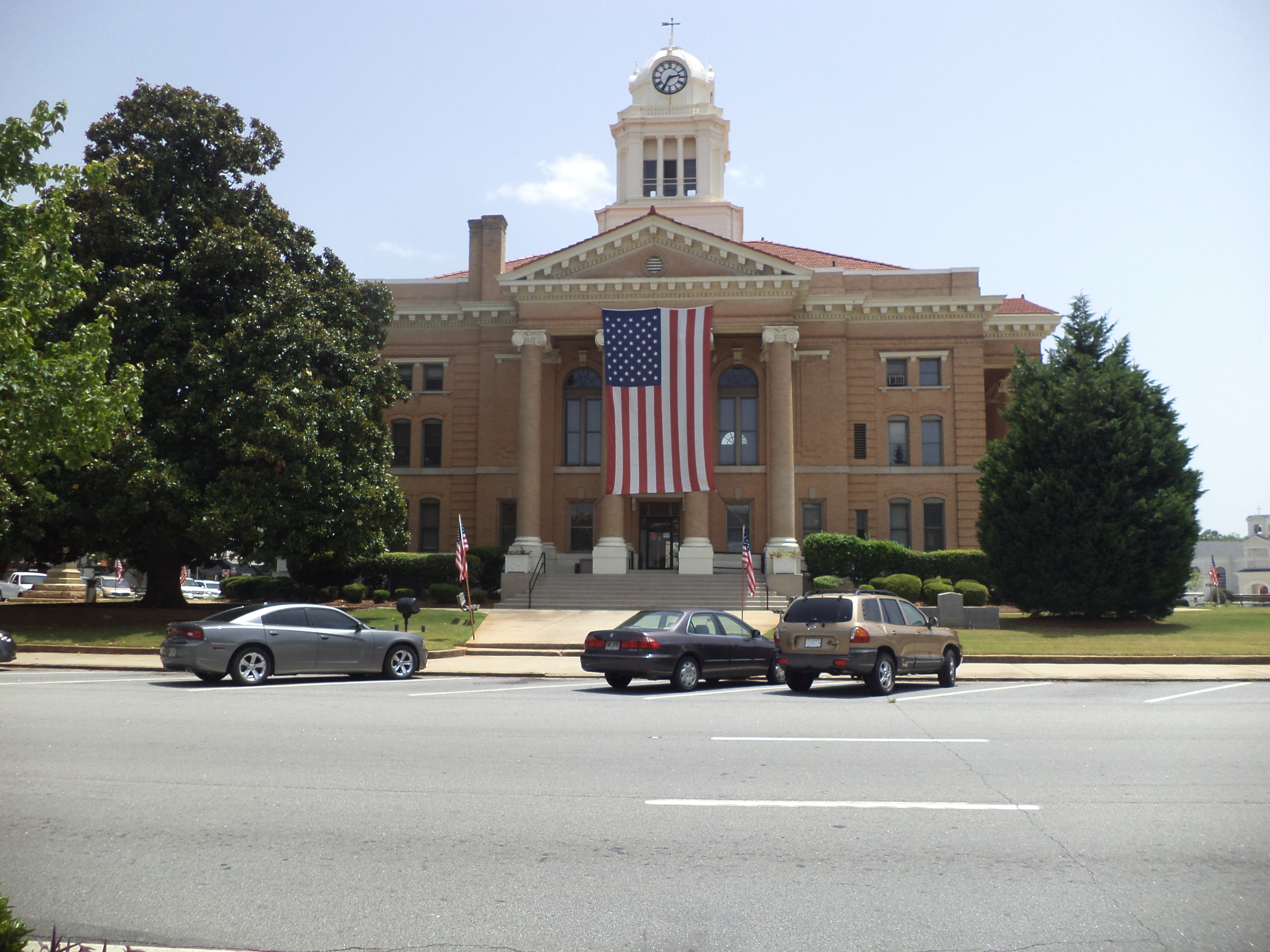
Upson County Courthouse built in 1908 in Thomaston, Georgia.

Thomaston was incorporated on January 1, 1825, and designated as the seat of Upson County. The town was named for General Jett Thomas, an Indian fighter in the War of 1812.

== Geography ==
Thomaston is located near the center of Upson County at 32.90 N, -84.333333 W (32° 54′ 0″ N, 84° 20′ 0″ W). The city is located in the west central Piedmont region of the state.

U.S. Route 19 is the main north–south route through the city, leading north 16 mi (26 km) to Zebulon and south 28 mi (45 km) to Butler. Georgia State Routes 36 and 74 are the main east–west routes through the city. GA-36 leads northeast 17 mi (27 km) to Barnesville and southwest 18 mi (29 km) to Woodland. GA-74 leads east 12 mi (19 km) to Yatesville and northwest 19 mi (31 km) to Woodbury. Atlanta is 60 mi (96 km) to the north and Macon is 46 mi (74 km) to the east.

== Demographics ==
Historical population
Census	Pop.	Note	%±
1880	570		—
1890	1,181		107.2%
1900	1,714		45.1%
1910	1,645		−4.0%
1920	2,502		52.1%
1930	4,922		96.7%
1940	6,396		29.9%
1950	6,580		2.9%
1960	9,336		41.9%
1970	10,024		7.4%
1980	9,682		−3.4%
1990	9,127		−5.7%
2000	9,411		3.1%
2010	9,170		−2.6%
2020	9,816		7.0%
2025 (est.)	9,852	▲	0.4%
U.S. Decennial Census; 1850-1870 1880; 1890-1910 1920-1930; 1930-1940 1940-1950; 1960-1980 1990; 2025

=== 2020 census ===
As of the 2020 census, Thomaston had a population of 9,816. The median age was 38.8 years. 23.8% of residents were under the age of 18 and 18.8% of residents were 65 years of age or older. For every 100 females there were 78.7 males, and for every 100 females age 18 and over there were 73.6 males age 18 and over.

96.7% of residents lived in urban areas, while 3.3% lived in rural areas.

There were 4,082 households in Thomaston, of which 31.2% had children under the age of 18 living in them. Of all households, 26.9% were married-couple households, 19.2% were households with a male householder and no spouse or partner present, and 46.3% were households with a female householder and no spouse or partner present. About 36.3% of all households were made up of individuals and 15.9% had someone living alone who was 65 years of age or older. As of the 2020 census, there were 1,779 families residing in the city.

There were 4,493 housing units, of which 9.1% were vacant. The homeowner vacancy rate was 3.1% and the rental vacancy rate was 5.8%.

Thomaston racial composition as of 2020
Race	Num.	Perc.
White (non-Hispanic)	4,899	49.91%
Black or African American (non-Hispanic)	4,202	42.81%
Native American	21	0.21%
Asian	34	0.35%
Pacific Islander	1	0.01%
Other/Mixed	357	3.64%
Hispanic or Latino	302	3.08%

== Arts and culture ==
=== National Register of Historic Places ===
The Upson County courthouse was built in 1908, and is listed on the National Register of Historic Places.

=== Annual events ===
Thomaston hosts an annual Emancipation Proclamation Celebration each May. It is the nation's oldest and longest running emancipation celebration of its kind.

== Parks ==
- Sprewell Bluff Park, on the Flint River

== Education ==
=== Thomaston-Upson County School District ===
The Thomaston-Upson County School District holds pre-school to grade twelve, and consists of two elementary schools, a middle school, and a high school. The district has 279 full-time teachers and over 5,009 students.

- Upson-Lee Middle School
- Upson-Lee High School

== Colleges and universities ==
Southern Crescent Technical College is located in Thomaston, and is a two-year technical school.

== Notable people ==
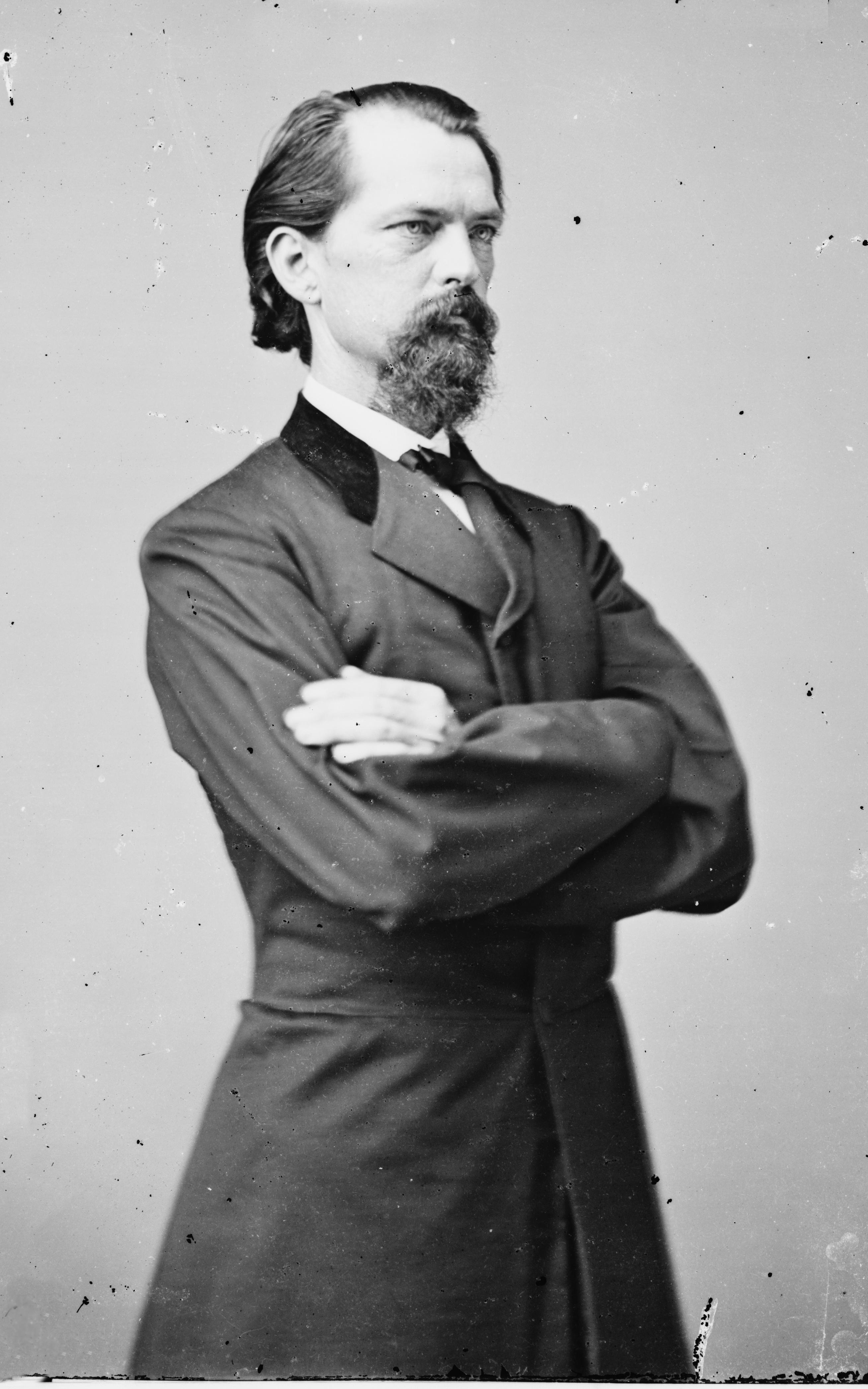
John Brown Gordon by Mathew Brady.

- Coy Bowles – musician and member of Zac Brown Band
- Elia Goode Byington (1858–1936) – journalist
- Kentavious Caldwell-Pope (b. 1993) – former University of Georgia basketball player, SEC basketball player of the year (2012-13 season), and first round draft pick in the 2013 NBA draft
- Mike Cavan (b. 1948) – former University of Georgia quarterback, college head coach (Valdosta State, East Tennessee State, and SMU), and director of football administration at the University of Georgia
- Wayne Cochran (1939–2017) – singer
- Scott Franklin (b. 1964) – U.S. representative for Florida's 18th congressional district
- Ivylyn Girardeau (1900–1987) – medical missionary in Pakistan and India
- John B. Gordon (1832–1904) – U.S. senator for Georgia, governor of Georgia, and Confederate States Army major general
- Frank Gordy (1904–1983) – founder of The Varsity fast-food chain
- William Guilford (1844–1909) – Georgia House of Representatives member
- Bill Hartman (1915–2006) – football player and College Football Hall of Fame inductee
- John Holliman (1948–1998) – journalist and correspondent for CNN, noted for his live coverage of the Persian Gulf War
- Marion Montgomery (1925–2011) – poet, novelist, educator, and critic
- Dallas Raines (b. 1954) – meteorologist
- Thelma Thompson Slayden (1907–1977) – novelist
- Hunter Strickland (b. 1988) – baseball player
- Travon Walker (b. 2000) – defensive lineman for the Jacksonville Jaguars. First overall pick in the 2022 NFL draft out of University of Georgia
