= Upson County, Georgia =

County in Georgia, United States

- County
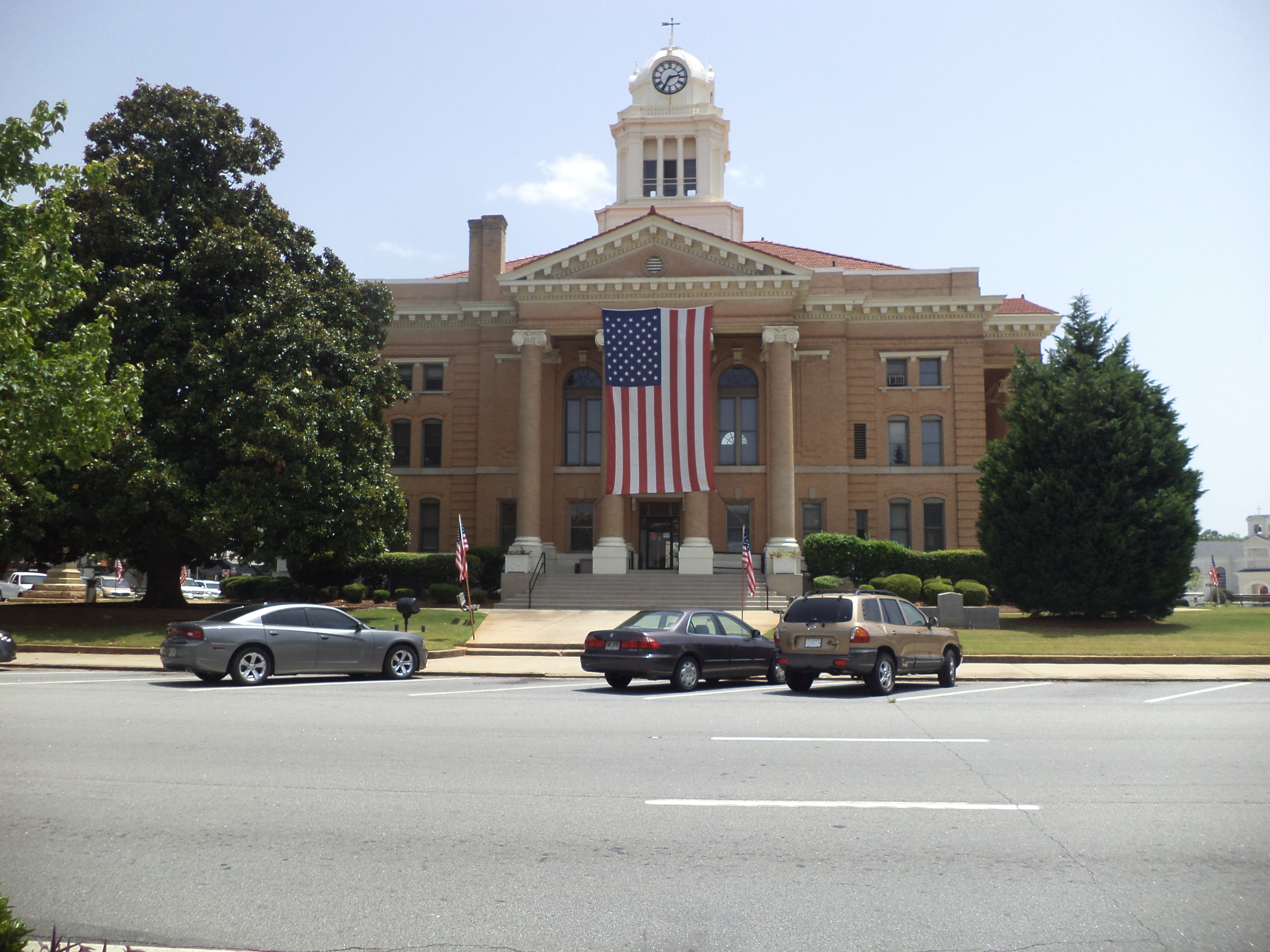
- Upson County Courthouse in Thomaston

- Location within the U.S. state of Georgia
- Coordinates: 32°53′N 84°18′W
- Country: United States
- State: Georgia
- Founded: December 15, 1824; 201 years ago
- Named for: Stephen Upson
- Seat: Thomaston
- Largest city: Thomaston

Area
  - Total: 328 sq mi (850 km^{2})
  - Land: 323 sq mi (840 km^{2})
  - Water: 4.1 sq mi (11 km^{2}) 1.3%

Population (2020)
  - Total: 27,700
  - Estimate (2025): 28,500 ▲
  - Density: 86/sq mi (33/km^{2})
- Time zone: UTC−5 (Eastern)
  - Summer (DST): UTC−4 (EDT)
- Congressional district: 3rd
- Website: www.upsoncountyga.org

Upson County is a county in the West Central region of the U.S. state of Georgia. As of the 2020 census, the population was 27,700. The county seat is Thomaston. The county was created on December 15, 1824.

Upson County comprises the Thomaston, GA Micropolitan Statistical Area, which is also included in the Atlanta-Athens-Clarke County-Sandy Springs CSA.

== History ==
Upson County was formed in 1824 and named after Stephen Upson, a state legislator.

=== Emancipation Day ===
On May 29, 1865, following the conclusion of the American Civil War, enslaved African Americans in the county were notified in Thomaston that they had been emancipated. By the following year, celebrations were held on that date, which continue to this day. It is considered one of the largest Emancipation Day celebrations in Georgia and one of the oldest continuously celebrated ones in the United States.

== Geography ==
According to the U.S. Census Bureau, the county has a total area of 328 square miles (850 km^{2}), of which 323 square miles (840 km^{2}) is land and 4.1 square miles (11 km^{2}) (1.3%) is water. Upson County boasts the lowest average summer humidity in the state.

The vast majority of Upson County is located in the Upper Flint River sub-basin of the ACF River Basin (Apalachicola-Chattahoochee-Flint River Basin), with just a tiny northeastern corner of the county, north of Yatesville, located in the Upper Ocmulgee River sub-basin of the Altamaha River basin.

=== Major highways ===
- U.S. Route 19 / State Route 3
- U.S. Route 80 / State Route 22
- State Route 36
- State Route 74
  - State Route 74 Alternate

=== Adjacent counties ===
- Lamar County - north
- Pike County - north
- Monroe County - east
- Crawford County - southeast
- Taylor County - south
- Talbot County - southwest
- Meriwether County - northwest

== Communities ==
=== City ===
- Thomaston

=== Town ===
- Yatesville

=== Census-designated places ===
- Hannahs Mill
- Lincoln Park
- The Rock
- Salem
- Sunset Village

=== Unincorporated communities ===
- Atwater
- Crest
- Dog Crossing

== Demographics ==
Historical population
Census	Pop.	Note	%±
1830	7,013		—
1840	9,408		34.2%
1850	9,424		0.2%
1860	9,910		5.2%
1870	9,430		−4.8%
1880	12,400		31.5%
1890	12,188		−1.7%
1900	13,670		12.2%
1910	12,757		−6.7%
1920	14,786		15.9%
1930	19,509		31.9%
1940	25,064		28.5%
1950	25,078		0.1%
1960	23,800		−5.1%
1970	23,505		−1.2%
1980	25,998		10.6%
1990	26,300		1.2%
2000	27,597		4.9%
2010	27,153		−1.6%
2020	27,700		2.0%
2025 (est.)	28,500	▲	2.9%
U.S. Decennial Census; 1790-1880 1890-1910; 1920-1930 1930-1940; 1940-1950 1960-1980; 1980-2000 2010

=== Racial and ethnic composition ===
Upson County, Georgia – Racial and ethnic composition Note: the US Census treats Hispanic/Latino as an ethnic category. This table excludes Latinos from the racial categories and assigns them to a separate category. Hispanics/Latinos may be of any race.
Race / Ethnicity (NH = Non-Hispanic)	Pop 1980	Pop 1990	Pop 2000	Pop 2010	Pop 2020	% 1980	% 1990	% 2000	% 2010	% 2020
White alone (NH)	18,716	18,833	19,271	18,522	18,009	71.99%	71.61%	69.83%	68.21%	65.01%
Black or African American alone (NH)	7,083	7,266	7,675	7,544	7,851	27.24%	27.63%	27.81%	27.78%	28.34%
Native American or Alaska Native alone (NH)	15	34	67	61	63	0.06%	0.13%	0.24%	0.22%	0.23%
Asian alone (NH)	40	63	102	124	151	0.15%	0.24%	0.37%	0.46%	0.55%
Native Hawaiian or Pacific Islander alone (NH)	x	x	6	3	1	x	x	0.02%	0.01%	0.00%
Other race alone (NH)	4	6	11	19	106	0.02%	0.02%	0.04%	0.07%	0.38%
Mixed race or Multiracial (NH)	x	x	138	292	886	x	x	0.50%	1.08%	3.20%
Hispanic or Latino (any race)	140	98	327	588	633	0.54%	0.37%	1.18%	2.17%	2.29%
Total	25,998	26,300	27,597	27,153	27,700	100.00%	100.00%	100.00%	100.00%	100.00%

=== 2020 census ===
As of the 2020 census, the county had a population of 27,700, 11,173 households, and 6,100 families residing in the county. The median age was 42.7 years. 21.6% of residents were under the age of 18 and 19.7% of residents were 65 years of age or older. For every 100 females there were 90.5 males, and for every 100 females age 18 and over there were 88.0 males age 18 and over. 53.3% of residents lived in urban areas, while 46.7% lived in rural areas.

The racial makeup of the county was 65.5% White, 28.5% Black or African American, 0.3% American Indian and Alaska Native, 0.5% Asian, 0.0% Native Hawaiian and Pacific Islander, 1.3% from some other race, and 3.8% from two or more races. Hispanic or Latino residents of any race comprised 2.3% of the population.

There were 11,173 households in the county, of which 29.4% had children under the age of 18 living with them and 33.3% had a female householder with no spouse or partner present. About 29.0% of all households were made up of individuals and 13.2% had someone living alone who was 65 years of age or older.

There were 12,301 housing units, of which 9.2% were vacant. Among occupied housing units, 62.1% were owner-occupied and 37.9% were renter-occupied. The homeowner vacancy rate was 1.7% and the rental vacancy rate was 5.6%.

== Politics ==
As of the 2020s, Upson County is a strongly Republican voting county, voting 70% for Donald Trump in 2024. For elections to the United States House of Representatives, Upson County is part of Georgia's 3rd congressional district, currently represented by Brian Jack. For elections to the Georgia State Senate, Upson County is part of District 18. For elections to the Georgia House of Representatives, Upson County is part of District 134.

United States presidential election results for Upson County, Georgia
Year	Republican		Democratic		Third party(ies)	
Year	No.	%	No.	%	No.	%
1912	7	1.19%	445	75.42%	138	23.39%
1916	18	1.78%	734	72.60%	259	25.62%
1920	170	15.08%	957	84.92%	0	0.00%
1924	37	6.37%	484	83.30%	60	10.33%
1928	221	23.46%	721	76.54%	0	0.00%
1932	20	1.19%	1,660	98.57%	4	0.24%
1936	138	8.57%	1,471	91.37%	1	0.06%
1940	159	6.64%	2,235	93.36%	0	0.00%
1944	243	9.33%	2,362	90.67%	0	0.00%
1948	262	8.75%	2,432	81.26%	299	9.99%
1952	648	14.45%	3,837	85.55%	0	0.00%
1956	712	17.22%	3,422	82.78%	0	0.00%
1960	1,001	23.48%	3,262	76.52%	0	0.00%
1964	3,103	48.61%	3,275	51.30%	6	0.09%
1968	1,494	22.73%	1,480	22.52%	3,599	54.75%
1972	4,892	84.52%	896	15.48%	0	0.00%
1976	2,897	40.71%	4,219	59.29%	0	0.00%
1980	2,788	36.52%	4,713	61.73%	134	1.76%
1984	4,803	62.01%	2,943	37.99%	0	0.00%
1988	4,614	63.05%	2,666	36.43%	38	0.52%
1992	4,053	45.03%	3,740	41.55%	1,208	13.42%
1996	3,783	47.08%	3,491	43.45%	761	9.47%
2000	5,019	60.60%	3,158	38.13%	105	1.27%
2004	6,634	65.72%	3,424	33.92%	36	0.36%
2008	7,291	63.77%	4,061	35.52%	82	0.72%
2012	7,230	64.10%	3,959	35.10%	90	0.80%
2016	7,292	66.69%	3,475	31.78%	167	1.53%
2020	8,606	66.68%	4,203	32.56%	98	0.76%
2024	9,528	69.74%	4,098	30.00%	36	0.26%

United States Senate election results for Upson County, Georgia2
Year	Republican		Democratic		Third party(ies)	
Year	No.	%	No.	%	No.	%
2020	8,568	66.32%	4,000	30.96%	351	2.72%
2020	8,498	68.92%	3,833	31.08%	0	0.00%

United States Senate election results for Upson County, Georgia3
Year	Republican		Democratic		Third party(ies)	
Year	No.	%	No.	%	No.	%
2020	4,239	33.30%	3,079	24.19%	5,411	42.51%
2020	8,608	67.20%	4,201	32.80%	0	0.00%
2022	6,685	66.42%	3,173	31.53%	206	2.05%
2022	6,043	67.78%	2,872	32.22%	0	0.00%

Georgia Gubernatorial election results for Upson County
Year	Republican		Democratic		Third party(ies)	
Year	No.	%	No.	%	No.	%
2022	7,096	70.01%	2,969	29.29%	70	0.69%

== Education ==
The Thomaston-Upson County School District has four schools, including the Upson-Lee High School.

== Notable people ==
- James L. Bentley
- C.C. Crews
- Martha Hudson
- John Brown Gordon
- Coy Bowles

== See also ==
- National Register of Historic Places listings in Upson County, Georgia
- List of counties in Georgia
