= 2017 Perryville tornado =

2017 EF4 tornado across Missouri and Illinois, USA

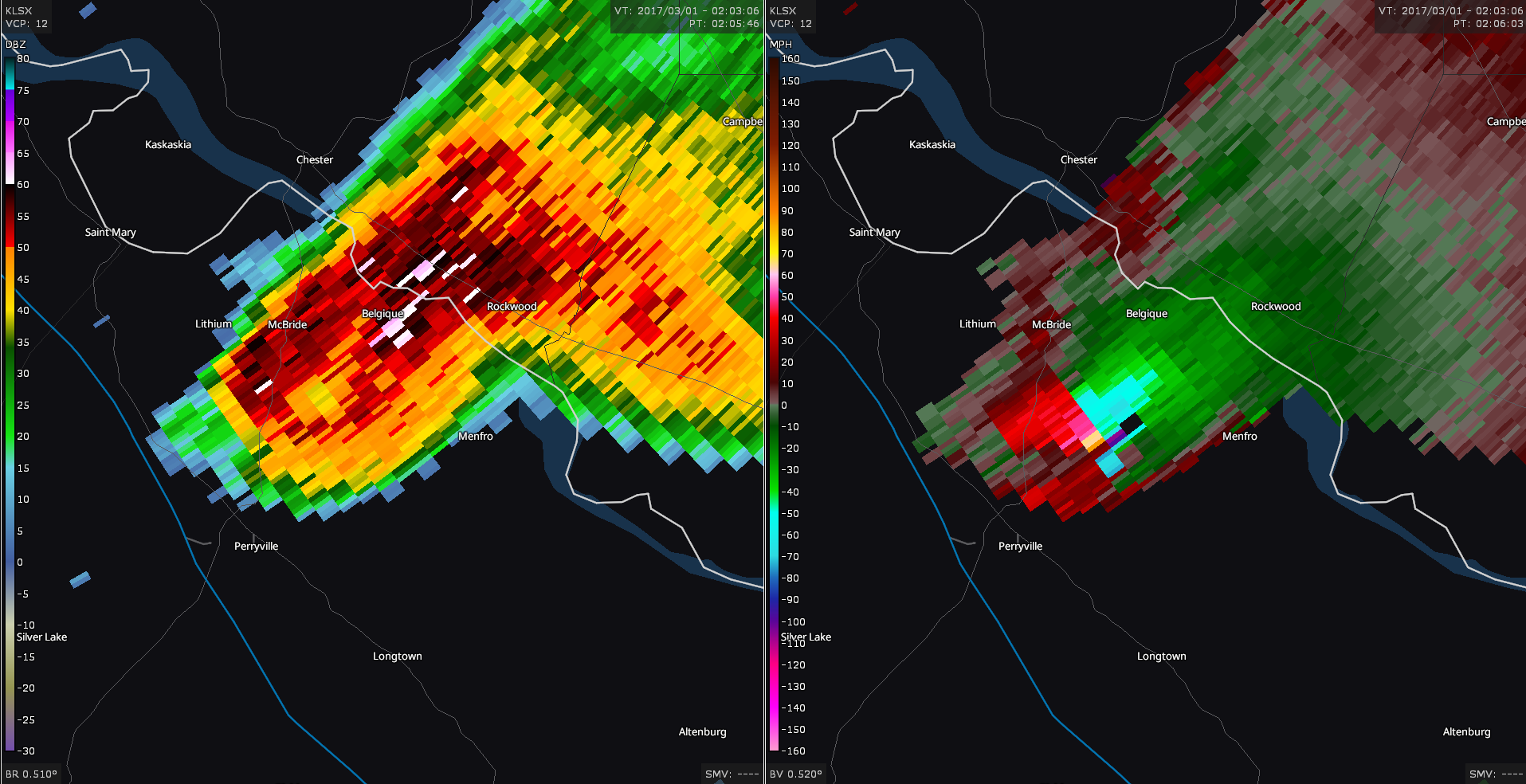
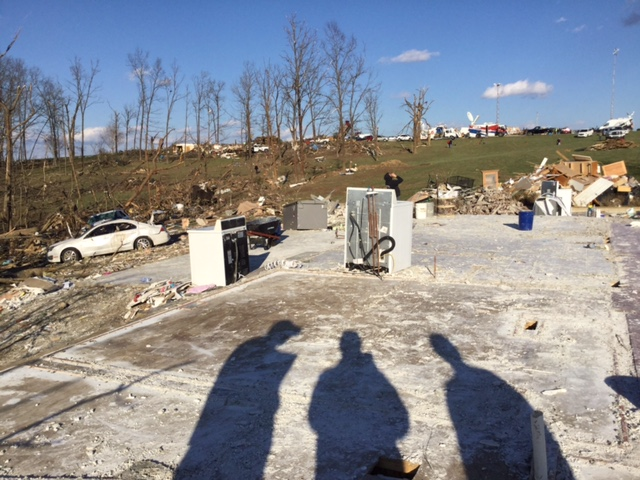
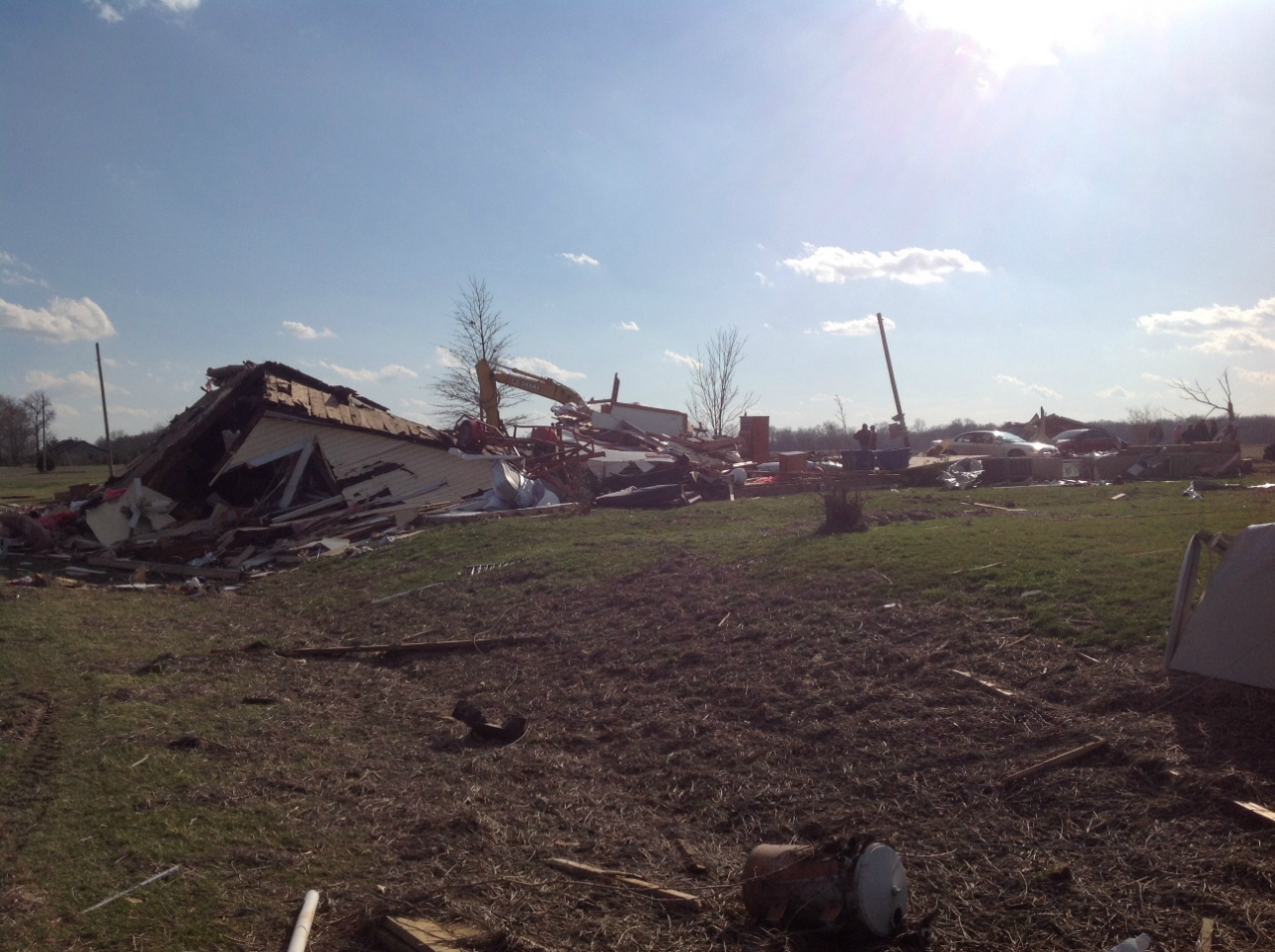
- Clockwise: View of the tornado in Jackson County, Illinois; EF4 damage to a relatively new home outside of Perryville, Missouri; aerial view of ground scarring left behind around Moore Drive and North Kingshighway Street; EF3 damage to a home in Vergennes, Illinois; a Next-Generation Radar (NEXRAD) scan of the tornado.

Meteorological history
- Formed: February 28, 2017; 7:51 p.m. CST (UTC–06:00)
- Dissipated: February 28, 2017; 8:57 p.m. CST (UTC–06:00)
- Duration: 1 hour, 6 minutes

EF4 tornado
- on the Enhanced Fujita scale
- Max width: 1,100 yards (0.63 mi; 1.0 km)
- Path length: 53.47 miles (86.05 km)
- Highest winds: 180 mph (290 km/h)

Overall effects
- Fatalities: 1
- Injuries: 12
- Damage: $14.8 million (2017 USD)
- Areas affected: Perryville, Missouri; and near Ava, Vergennes, Elkville and Mulkeytown, Illinois, United States
- Part of the Tornado outbreak of February 28 – March 1, 2017 and Tornadoes of 2017

Just after nightfall on February 28, 2017, a violent tornado struck just outside of the city of Perryville, located in the state of Missouri, and caused devastating damage to multiple homes and neighborhoods before crossing the Mississippi River into Illinois, where many rural communities and farmsteads were impacted. The tornado was part of a prolific and widespread winter outbreak in the United States that impacted much of both the Mississippi and Ohio River Valleys. One person was killed and a dozen others were injured in its wake, with damage estimates totaling nearly $15 million. The tornado tracked a long path of 53.47 miles (86.05 km), and at a maximum width of 1,100 yards (0.63 mi; 1.0 km) from Perry County, Missouri, to Franklin County, Illinois, during its over hour-long lifetime before dissipating southwest of Christopher, Illinois.

The tornado was rated at mid-range EF4 on the Enhanced Fujita scale, with estimated winds of 180 mph (290 km/h) by the National Weather Service weather forecasting office (WFO) in Paducah, Kentucky. It is one of the few violent (F4/EF4+) rated tornadoes to occur near the path of the 1925 Tri-State tornado, which took place nearly 92 years prior.

== Meteorological synopsis ==
Storm Prediction Center outlooks on Feb. 28, 2017

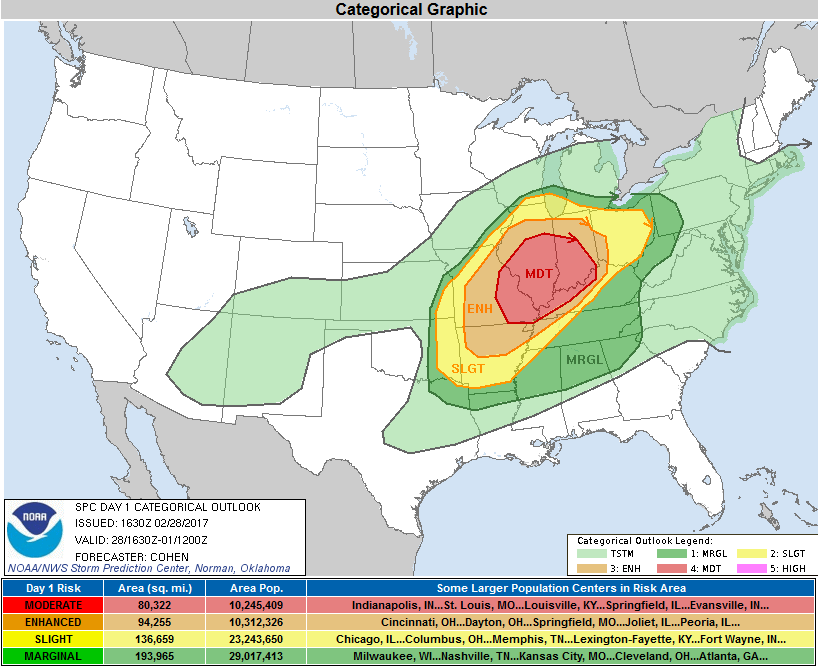
Day 1 categorical outlooks.

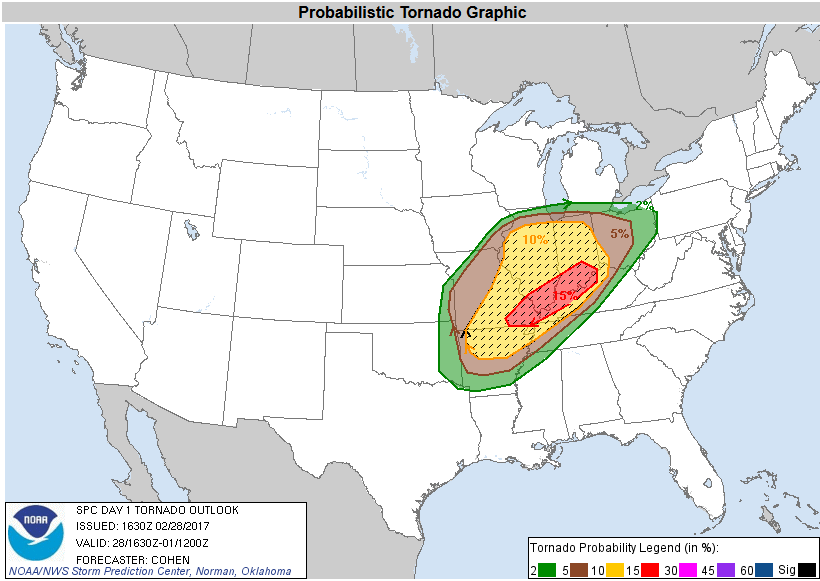
Day 1 tornado outlooks.

=== Episode narrative ===
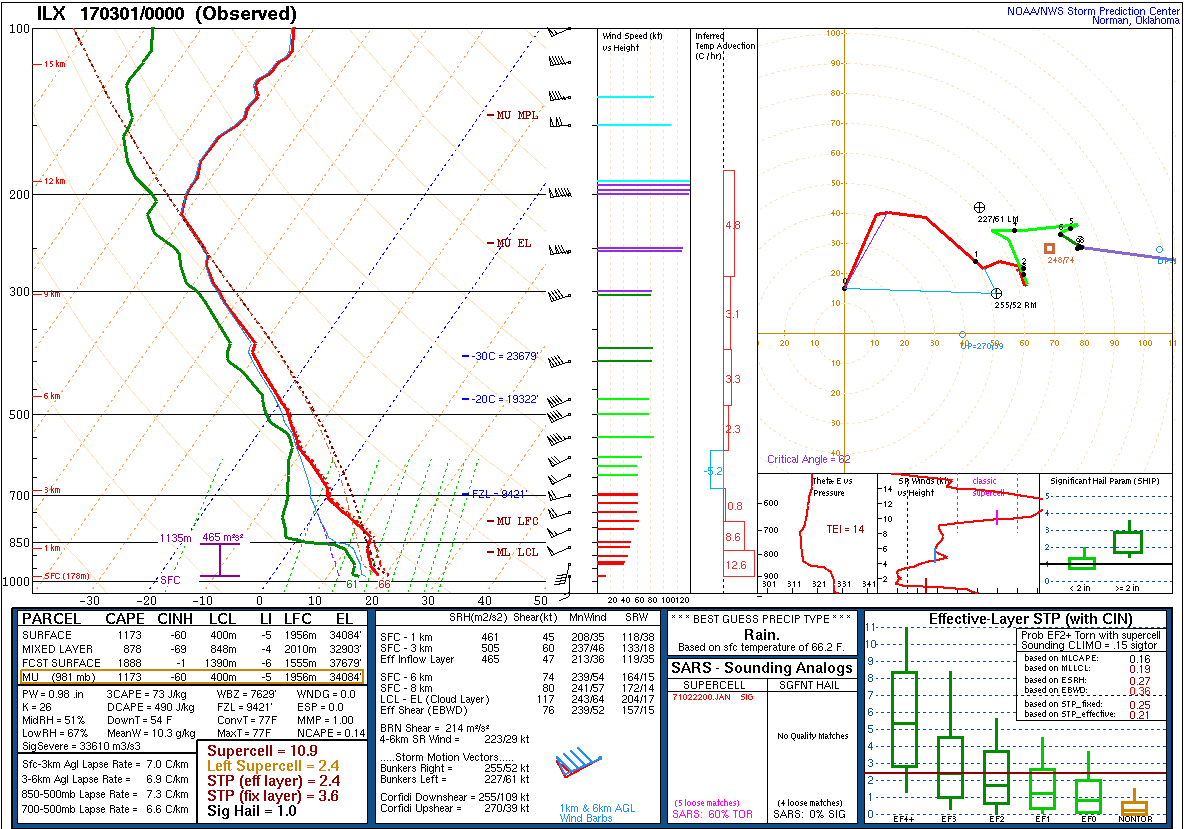
An atmospheric sounding recorded in central Illinois on February 28.

At 12:00 a.m. CST (06:00 UTC) on February 28, the Storm Prediction Center outlined an enhanced risk for much of the central and eastern United States, primarily southeast Missouri, alongside a 10% probability for tornadoes within 25 mi (40 km) of a point in the region as the environment grew more favorable for supercellular development. A low-level jet began to strengthen over northern Illinois, with substantial low-level moisture being present throughout Arkansas, Missouri, and Illinois. As the day progressed, a large-scale, mid-level trough over the Great Basin and Lower Colorado River Valley began to move eastward, which triggered an area of low-pressure and cold front to form.

=== Event narrative ===
At 10:30 a.m. CST (16:30 UTC), the Storm Prediction Center upgraded from an enhanced risk to a moderate risk for portions of eastern Missouri and neighboring states. Additionally, an area with a 15% probability for tornadoes within 25 mi (40 km) of a point was highlighted, stretching from southeast Missouri to southern Indiana. With the low-level jet bringing additional moisture to the region, the cold front began to travel through an environment primed for severe storm formation, with ample moisture, strong, low-level wind shear, and moderate atmospheric instability being present. At 2:00 p.m. CST (20:00 UTC), storm development began over southern Missouri, with the first wave of severe thunderstorms moving across the region on the evening of February 28. Isolated supercell thunderstorms formed across southeast Missouri, with the most intense of these storms producing the tornado that would later strike areas near Perryville, Missouri.

== Tornado summary ==
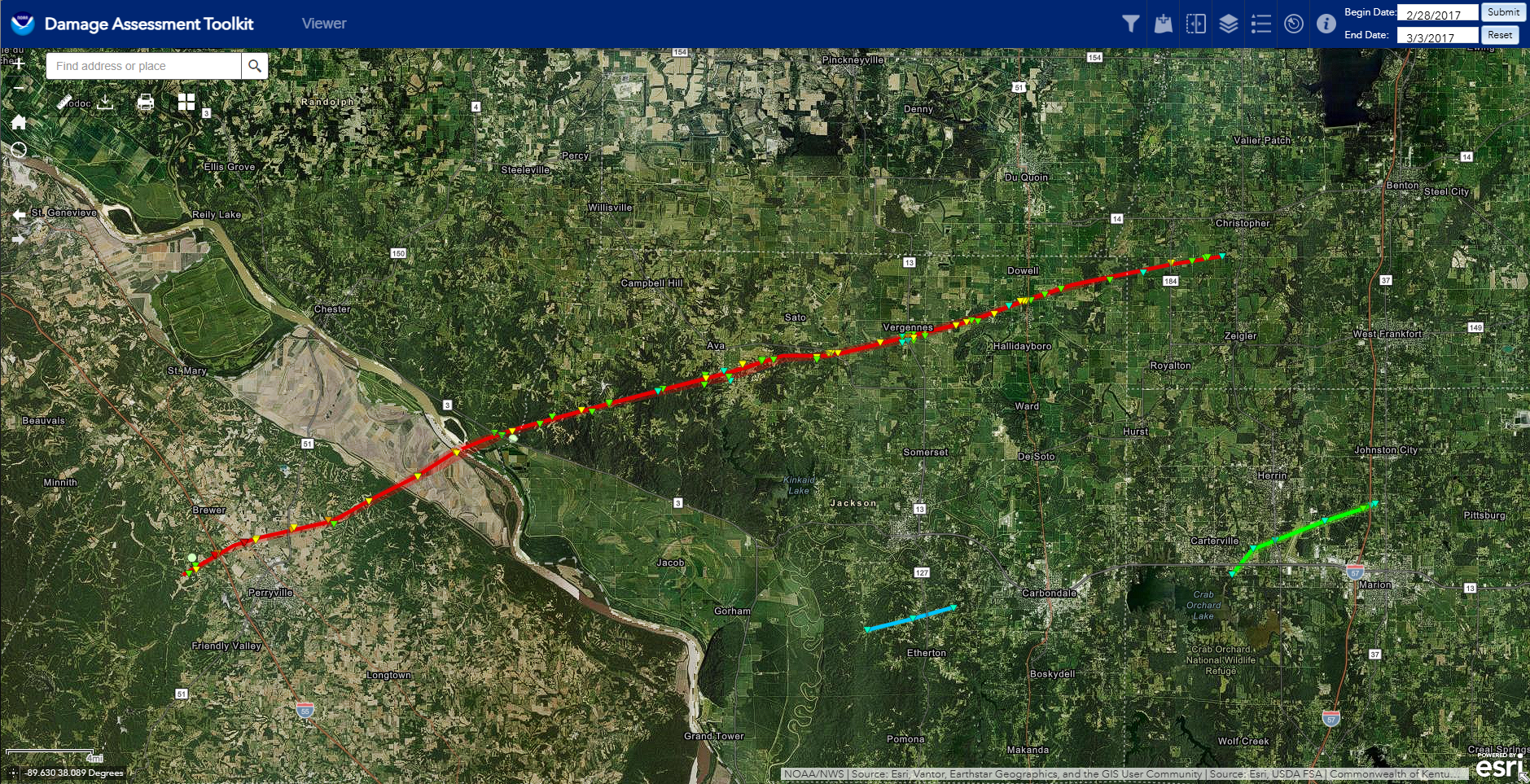
Tracks of EF0, EF1 and EF4 tornadoes across Missouri and Illinois on February 28 and March 1. Parameters EF0 / 65–85 mph EF1 / 86–110 mph EF2 / 111–135 mph EF3 / 136–165 mph EF4 / 166–200 mph ⎯ Center of the EF4 tornado

=== Touch down west of Perryville ===
The tornado began at 7:51 p.m. CST (01:51 UTC), to the west of Perryville along Highway North. Along the road, the tornado snapped trees at EF1 intensity, with winds of 100 mph (160 km/h) before moving on to the east-northeast. The National Weather Service (NWS) issued a tornado warning a minute later for the area at 7:52 p.m. CST (01:52 UTC).

=== Rapid intensification and devastation ===
Not long after it began, on County Road 810 an outbuilding was struck and destroyed as the tornado intensified to EF2 intensity. It then passed through a forest along South Fork Saline Creek, strengthening at an unusual rate within 2 miles (3.2 km) from its touch down. At a neighborhood along Rock Valley Lane, west of Interstate 55 and just northwest of the outskirts of Perryville, the tornado then abruptly became violent as it leveled two homes at EF4 intensity on Kyle Lane. The tornado destroyed a relatively new, 12-year old home with winds approaching 180 mph (290 km/h). Nearby a large, anchored outbuilding was swept away at EF2 intensity, with winds at 129 mph (208 km/h), another home built in 1981 was destroyed at 165 mph (266 km/h), indicative of EF3 intensity winds and vehicles were blown 200–300 yards (180–270 m) to the east.

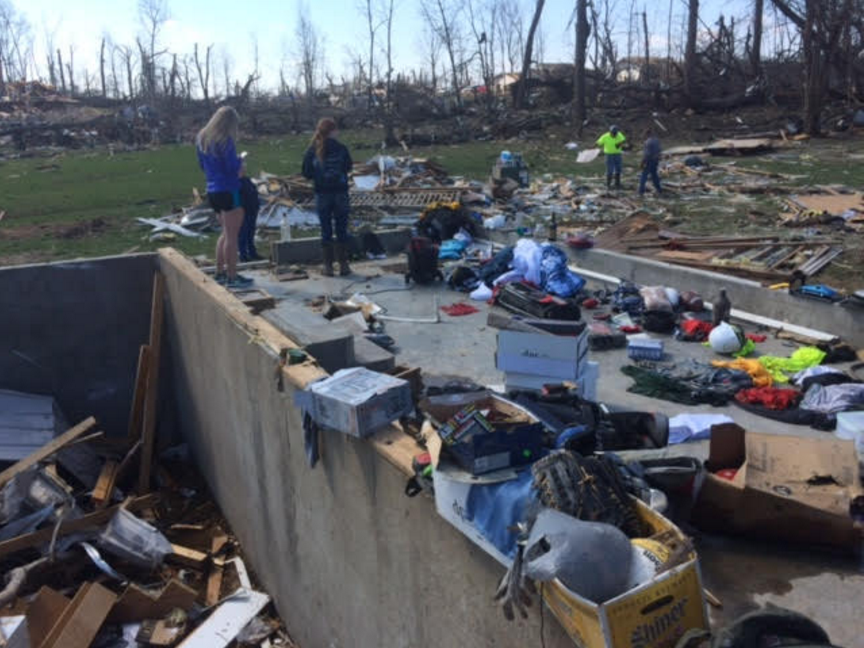
EF4 damage to a home along North Kingshighway Street, outside of Perryville, Missouri.

As the tornado crossed the interstate, a man who was driving southbound was killed as the circulation passed, ejecting him from his car and blowing the vehicle off the road. A passenger was also ejected from the vehicle, but survived the encounter. The tornado would then plow through some treelines and fields, until again causing violent damage to a neighborhood along North Kingshighway Street and Moore Drive. In this area, two residences were obliterated at mid-range EF4 intensity, with estimated winds at maximum of 180 mph (290 km/h). In one of the destroyed homes, two residents sheltered in a basement as they rode out the tornado. A car was blown to the northwest from a carport, and nearby trees were "nubbed" as only the trunks and largest branches remained. The tornado then weakened but remained significant as it caused occasional EF2-EF3 damage to homes, outbuildings and trees north of Perryville to parts of northeastern Perry County, before crossing the Mississippi River into the neighboring state of Illinois.

=== Trek through rural Randolph and Jackson Counties ===
Upon crossing into Randolph County, Illinois, the tornado would briefly enter the county warning area (CWA) of the NWS WFO in St. Louis, Missouri. Near Rockwood, the tornado snapped tree trunks at EF2 intensity. The only structure impacted was a home which suffered EF0 damage, before the tornado quickly exited Randolph County and re-entered the CWA of the NWS WFO in Paducah, Kentucky, in Jackson County. The tornado fluctuated between EF1-EF2 intensity as it traveled through forested areas. Passing south of Ava, the circulation began to cause consistent EF2 damage to trees and structures as it went along Rattlesnake Creek. Nearby storm chasers recorded the tornado, which was hidden by its nocturnal nature, but revealed itself by its constant loud roar and occasional powerflashes. Southeast and due east of Ava, the tornado destroyed barns and snapped trees.

The storm then started closing in on Vergennes, remaining strong before intensifying to EF3 intensity as it impacted the southern side of the village. Along IL-127, a residence was leveled with winds of 145 mph (233 km/h), as the core of the tornado passed directly over. After passing by, EF2 damage ensued at multiple homes and at one destroyed farmstead to the east of Vergennes. The tornado would then thread the needle as it passed between the villages of Elkville and Dowell, damaging multiple homes along Lacy Road at EF2 intensity. The tornado began to narrow even further in size as it closed in on Campbell Lake.

=== Reintensification in Franklin County and dissipation ===
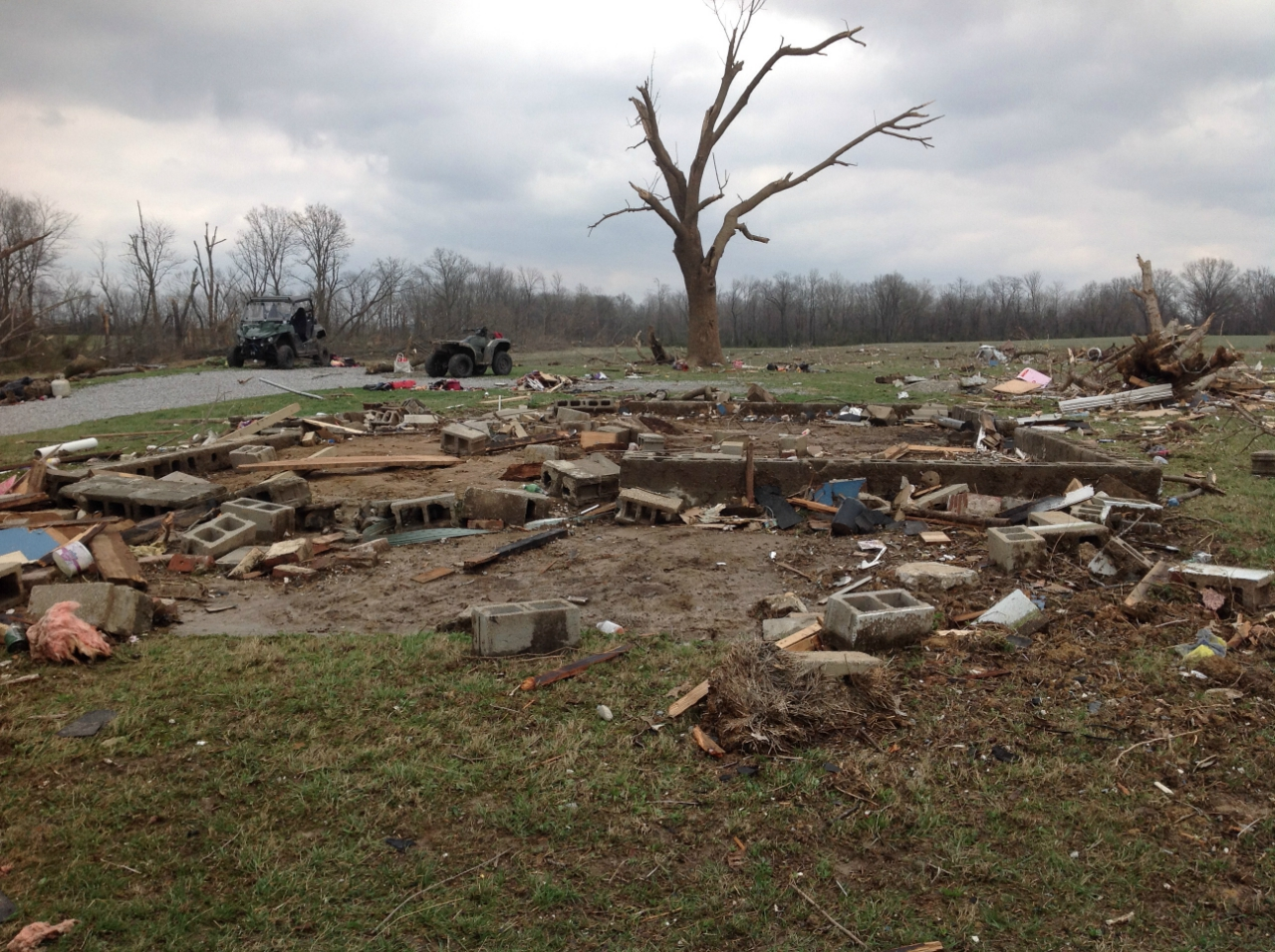
EF3 damage to a farmhouse south of Mulkeytown, Illinois.

The tornado entered Franklin County as it was reaching near the end of its life. It first caused EF0 damage by snapping branches off of trees along Big Pond Road, southwest of Mulkeytown. However, after crossing through a field and some tree groves, the tornado would abruptly reach near violent intensity along IL-184, as it completely wiped away a farmhouse and shredded debris at EF3 intensity, with corresponding winds of 160 mph (260 km/h).

The residence was once rated as EF4 intensity, but on more thorough analysis, the damage surveyors from the NWS Paducah, Kentucky WFO concluded it was more akin to EF3 damage, as the home sat on an unanchored concrete block foundation. At the farmhouse, the tornado obliterated a treeline at EF2 intensity. Nearby, a dashcam shot was captured of the tornado. It caused EF1 damage to a barn and two farmhouses, and shortly after doing EF0 damage to a tree, it dissipated to the southwest of Christopher at 8:57 p.m. CST (02:57 UTC). In Missouri, the tornado was rated at EF4 with estimated winds of 180 mph (290 km/h), while in Illinois it was rated at EF3 with estimated winds of 160 mph (260 km/h).

The parent supercell persisted on into the later night hours, and produced an EF3 tornado near Crossville, close to the track of the 1925 Tri-State tornado at that point before moving onwards into southwestern Indiana.

== Aftermath ==
=== Historical statistics ===
The tornado was the strongest of an outbreak, lasting from February 28 to March 1 across the Midsouthern and Midwestern United States. It was the first of two EF4-rated tornadoes to occur in the country during the 2017 season, with the other violent tornado occurring over in Texas in the spring. It was also the first time the state of Missouri saw a violent tornado within its borders since the 2011 Joplin tornado, nearly 6 years prior.

The track of the 2017 tornado that struck Perryville is also among one of a few violent tornadoes, rated 4 or 5 on both the Fujita and Enhanced Fujita scales, to occur in the vicinity of the historic Tri-State tornado that occurred in 1925. It was also the longest tracked tornado in the CWA of NWS Paducah, Kentucky since an F4 tornado struck the town of East Prairie, Missouri on April 22, 1981. On December 10, 2021, a very long-track, catastrophic tornado in western Kentucky became the longest tracked tornado ever recorded in this WFO's CWA, putting a distance of 128 miles (206 km) across the region.

On March 14, 2025, an EF2 tornado struck the eastern areas of Perryville. It was a part of a devastating outbreak that impacted nearly similar areas hit by the deadly outbreak the 2017 EF4 tornado was a part of.

=== Damage and casualties ===
A day after the tornado occurred on March 1, damage surveyors from NWS Paducah, Kentucky preliminarily rated the tornado as an EF3, with a track length of nearly 50 miles from Perryville, Missouri to Christopher, Illinois. On March 4, four days after the tornado, the tornado was officially given a rating of EF4 with estimated winds of 180 mph. Across its path from Perry County, Missouri to Randolph, Jackson and Franklin Counties in Illinois, the tornado caused approximately US$14.8 million in estimated damages.

The tornado also was responsible for one death and a dozen injuries throughout its wake. 24-year old Travis Koenig, a maintenance technician at a Unilever facility in Sikeston was driving southbound on Interstate 55, northwest of Perryville when the tornado struck. He alongside a friend were blown off the road and ejected, with Koenig being fatally injured in the process. On March 2, the community of Perryville set up a funeral to mourn Koenig's death, with a white cross set up next to the interstate where he was killed.

=== Recovery efforts ===
Months after the tornado, a severe flash flooding event took place in parts of the lower to central Mississippi River Valley, which includes Missouri. Residents of Perryville recovered by hiring in contractors and negotiating with insurance companies, for both the EF4 tornado and the floods. More than a hundred homes were damaged, and dozens were destroyed, requiring tons of assistance in the coming months. In late-April to early-May 2017, the Perry County Emergency Management, led by director Hank Voelker, ran a storefront stocked on donations for residents affected by the EF4 tornado in February, and subsequent flash floods in the spring. The governor of Missouri, Eric Greitens visited the nearby areas, offering state-wide help for recovery efforts. Alongside governmental figures, many bands such as Kickin' Kountry hosted musical events to raise up donations in Perryville.

In late-October, homes along Moore Drive and North Kingshighway Street, the hardest hit area were for most parts rebuilt after the storm. New homes were fitted with a storm shelter or tornado safe space. Approximately 80% of residents around that area returned to their newly built homes, while the remaining 20% decided to not come back.

Perryville and the surrounding areas in Perry County are a largely Catholic and Lutheran community. On March 3, the Lutheran Early Response Team (LERT) arrived on scene in the hardest hit areas from the tornado. The LERT volunteers helped remove and dispose of debris, and collected lost items found in nearby farm fields.

In Illinois, the tornado crossed the Mississippi River into the northwestern parts of the Shawnee National Forest, in Jackson County. This area of the forest was a jumble of fallen trees according to one source and infested with invasive plant species in 2018, a year after the tornado. Communities in this state also recovered well, with the governor of Illinois, Bruce Rauner visiting areas hit near Elkville to tour the damage.

== See also ==
- Tornado climatology
- Tornadoes of 2017
- Weather of 2017
- Nocturnal tornado
- List of F4, EF4, and IF4 tornadoes
  - List of F4 and EF4 tornadoes (2010–2019)
- 2021 Western Kentucky tornado – A catastrophic, nocturnal EF4 tornado in Kentucky that became the longest tracked tornado in the region.
