= Weather of 2017 =

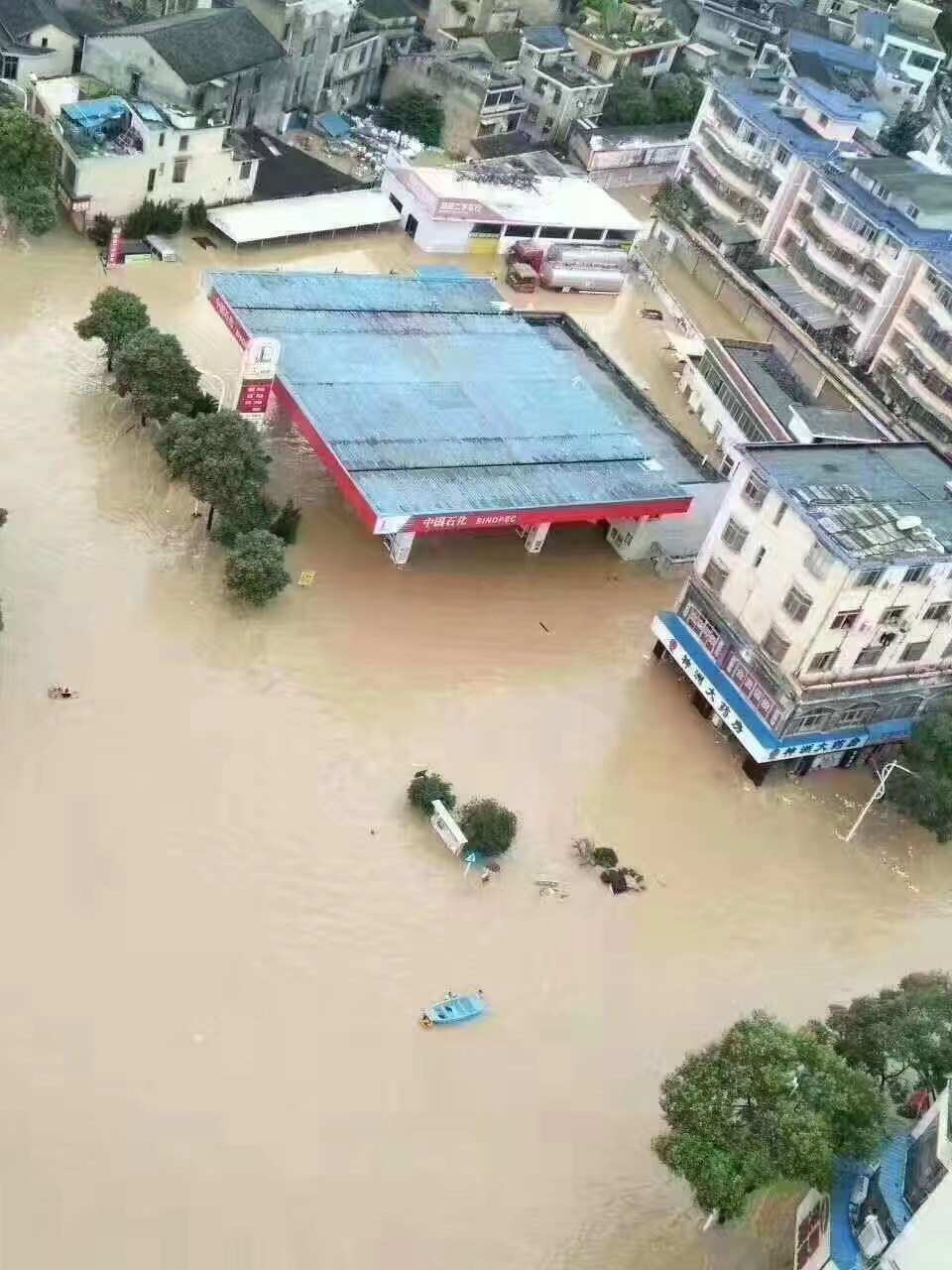
Flooding in China's Hunan province in July 2017

The following is a list of weather events that occurred in 2017.

== Summary by weather type ==
=== Winter storms and cold waves ===
Winter weather in 2017 kicked off with a winter storm from January 4-8. This winter storm causes six fatalities. Around a week later, an ice storm causes 9 fatalities. Portland, Oregon saw the most snow in a single day in 20 years. Around a week after that, a nor'easter from the Tornado outbreak of January 21-23, 2017 caused a death in Philadelphia, It also resulted in 100 accidents in Quebec. After a lull in activity, winter weather resumed on February 9, which caused a man to die in Manhattan. New York City had record warmth the day before. Then, another winter storm rode up the East Coast a few days later, killing two. Six thousand power outages occur in Nova Scotia. A month later, a giant blizzard rode up the East Coast. At least 16 people were killed. A record no-snow streak in Chicago was ended. Another winter storm affected the Rocky Mountains in late April. Pueblo, Colorado saw 9200 power outages as a result, and portions of Interstate 70 in Kansas shut down. While mostly rain, a significant storm complex affected the Northeastern United States in late October. It caused over $100 million in damage, and 1.3 million power outages. Maine set a record number of power outages. However, the mountains of West Virginia record up to 8.4 inches (21 cm) of snow. In early December, a winter storm results in 3 deaths and 400,000 power outages. The year ends with a record breaking cold wave. Flint, Michigan set a monthly record low.

=== Floods ===
During January-February California, USA suffered from flooding, landslides and the Oroville Dam spillway that led to the evacuation of 188,000 people. During January-April the coastal El Niño caused severe floods in Peru. Hundreds of thousands were affected as well as severe infrastructure damage. During March-April Queensland and New South Wales in Australia experienced heavy rain and Cyclone Debbi causing large scale floodings, population evacuation and agricultural losses. From April to May Québec and Ontario, Canada had a record spring rainfall and snow melting causing large scale floodings with thousands evacuated. In April-May record rainfall cause major floodings across Missouri and Arkansas in the US causing more than US$2 billion in damages. During June-September South Asia experienced major floodings affecting millions and causing severe damage in India, Nepal and Bangladesh following extensive Monsoon rains. In June and July Southern and central China experienced intense and heavy rains causing widespread floodings, severe infrastructure damage and affecting millions of people and the economy. July-September saw seasonal rainfall in West Africa causing widespread floods affecting Niger, Nigeria, Sierra Leone and other countries. In August 2017 Hurricane Harvey hit Texas and Louisiana in the United States, causing large scale floodings. Hurricane Irma hit the Caribbean and southeastern United States in September, causing large scale floodings. In September Hurricane Maria hit Puerto Rico and Dominica causing catastrophic floodings which caused extensive long time infrastructure damages. In October Vietnam experienced continues tropical rainstorms causing extensive floodings with hundreds dead and large scale agricultural and infrastructure damages.

=== Tornadoes ===
The year started with an intense tornado outbreak that became the 2nd largest and 2nd deadliest for January. The 81 tornadoes resulted in 20 deaths. An EF3 tornado in Mississippi caused 4 deaths, 57 injuries and $9.46 million in damage. The next day, an EF3 tornado in Georgia causes 11 deaths, 45 injuries and $2.5 million in damage. Another EF3 tornado in Georgia caused 5 deaths, 40 injuries and $310 million in damage. Total damage was $1.3 billion in damages. Two weeks later, an EF3 tornado strikes New Orleans, causing 33 injuries, including 5-6 serious. It caused at least $2.7 million in damage. It was part of a small outbreak of 15 tornadoes that day. Total economic losses were estimated at $175 million. Another intense outbreak occurs in late February and early March. This included an EF4 tornado in Missouri and Illinois, causing 1 death, 12 injuries and $14.8 million in damage. Another EF3 in Illinois and Indiana causes 1 death, 2 injuries and $5.7 million in damage. As another tornado that day killed two in Illinois, the total death toll was four. Total damage is $1.3 billion. A week later, another tornado outbreak affected the Central United States. Nineteen people were injured, Damage totaled $2.5 billion. More tornadoes affect the US on April 2 and 3. The 59 tornadoes from the system cause 3 deaths. Less than a week later, two die due to a tornado in Paraguay. Another tornado outbreak affected the United States in late April and early May. The storm system resulted in $1.9 billion, and caused 20 total deaths. Five of those deaths are tornadic. Two fatal tornadoes strike Canton, Texas which cause a combined 4 fatalities, 49 injuries and $1.87 million. A tornado outbreak sequence in mid to late May results in 2 deaths, 39 injuries and $975 million. Significant tornadic activity slowed down after this. On August 6, a small outbreak of tornadoes occurred near Tulsa, Oklahoma. The tornadoes cause 30 injuries, all due to an EF2 in Tulsa, and $50.24 million, of which $50 million is due to the EF2 in Tulsa. Five days later, more tornadoes occur in China. The tornadoes cause 5 deaths and 58 injuries.

=== Tropical cyclones ===
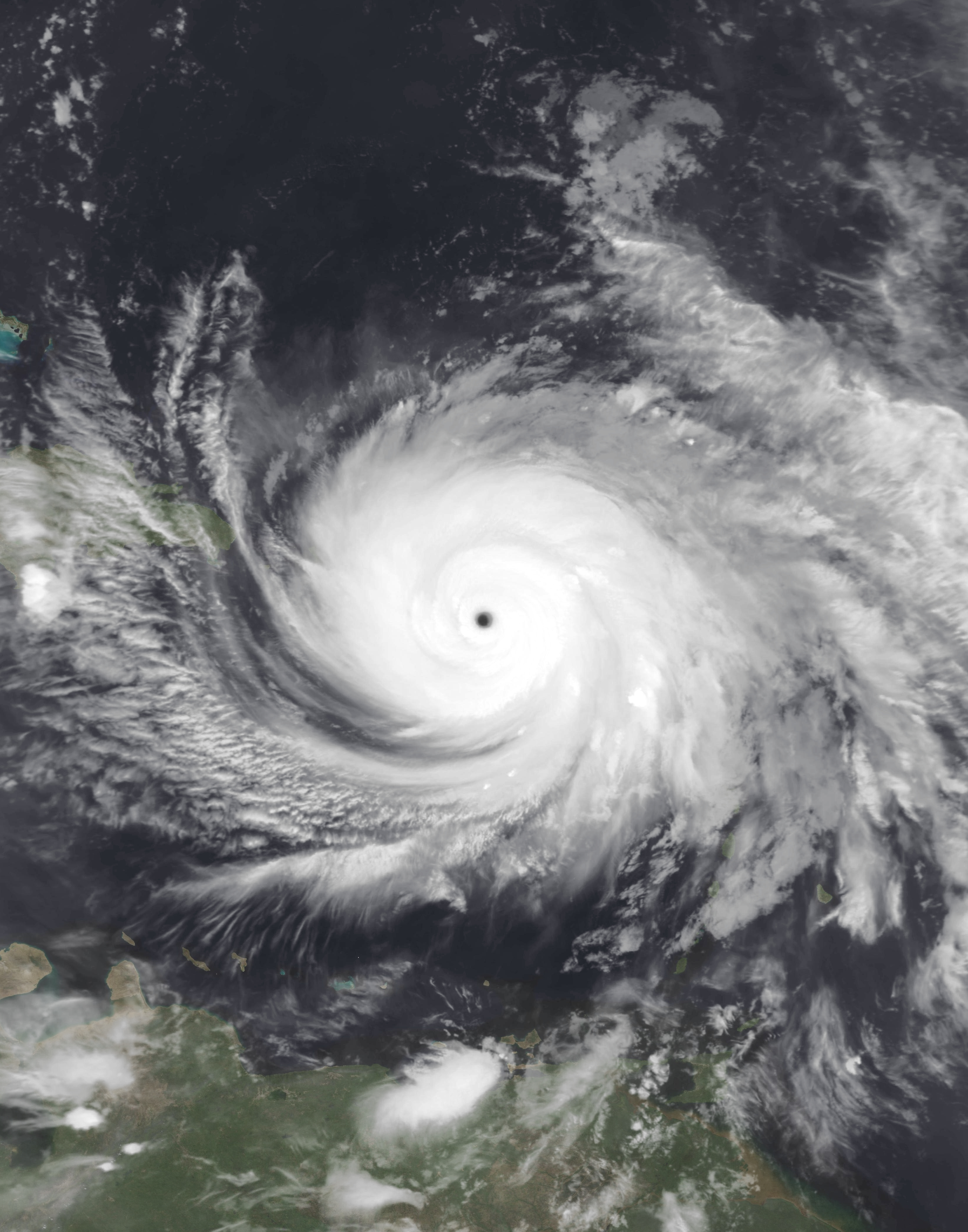
Satellite image of Hurricane Maria nearing Puerto Rico

The first tropical cyclone of the year was a tropical disturbance in the South Pacific, which formed on January 2 over the Solomon Islands. It was the first of 20 tropical cyclones in the South Pacific during the year, including Cyclone Donna, which became the strongest cyclone on record in the basin in the month of May, with 10 minute sustained winds of 205 km/h (125 mph). In the neighboring Australian basin, there were 28 tropical cyclones, most of them weak; however, Cyclone Ernie in April reached Category 5 intensity on the Australian tropical cyclone intensity scale, with 10 minute sustained winds of 220 km/h (140 mph). Cyclone Debbie struck Queensland in March, causing A$3.5 billion (US$2.67 billion) in damage and 14 deaths across Australia. In November, Cyclone Cempaka killed 41 people in Indonesia from heavy rainfall. The south-west Indian Ocean was quiet, with only six tropical cyclones during the year. Of these, Cyclone Dineo in February killed at least 258 people when it moved through Mozambique and Zimbabwe. Cyclone Enawo struck Madagascar in March, killing 78 people. There was also a subtropical cyclone – Guará – which formed off Brazil in December.

In the northern hemisphere, activity began on January 7, when a tropical depression formed and later moved across the Philippines, killing 11 people. It was the first of 41 tropical cyclones in the western Pacific Ocean in the year. The final two storms of the season – Kai-tak and Tembin – moved through the Philippines in December, together causing 406 deaths. The year's costliest typhoon was Hato, which left more than US$4.34 billion in damage when it moved ashore southern China near Hong Kong. In the north Indian Ocean, there were 10 tropical cyclones, which included several deadly storms. Cyclone Ockhi in December killed more than 137 people in Sri Lanka and southern India. There were 20 tropical cyclones in the eastern Pacific Ocean, including Tropical Storm Lidia, which killed 20 people when it struck western Mexico.

In the Atlantic Ocean, activity began in April and lasted until November, with 18 tropical cyclones, including several deadly and costly storms. In August, Hurricane Harvey struck southeastern Texas and subsequently stalled over the state, dropping 60.58 in (1,539 mm) of rainfall; this was the highest amount of precipitation associated with a tropical cyclone in the United States. The rains caused widespread flooding along the storm's path, particularly near Houston, resulting in more than 100 fatalities and US$125 billion in damage, tying Harvey with Hurricane Katrina in 2005 as the costliest United States hurricane. In September, Hurricane Irma struck the northern Lesser Antilles and later Cuba as a Category 5 hurricane, and later Florida at a lower intensity, causing more than US$50 billion in damage and 139 deaths. Two weeks after Irma, Hurricane Maria struck Dominica as a Category 5 hurricane and later Puerto Rico as a Category 4 hurricane, causing US$90 billion in damage and more than 3,000 deaths, mostly in Puerto Rico. Also during the season, Hurricane Nate produced damaging floods across Central America, killing 45 people.

In addition to the above cyclones, there was a Mediterranean tropical-like cyclone called Cyclone Numa, which killed 22 people when it struck Greece.

== Timeline ==
This is a timeline of weather events during 2017. Please note that entries might cross between months, however, all entries are listed by the month they started.

=== January ===
- January 2 – A tornado outbreak, across the Gulf Coast of the United States, killed four people (non-tornadic) and caused over $250 million (2017 USD) in damage from 36 tornadoes.
- January 10–17 – An ice storm and tornado outbreak across North America killed nine people, injured two others (tornadic), and caused multiple states to declare a state of emergency. The storm produced 11 tornadoes in Texas.
- January 21–24 – A tornado outbreak, windstorm, and nor'easter, across the Southeastern and Northeastern United States and Quebec, killed 22 people (20 tornadic and 2 non-tornadic), injured 204 others, and caused $1.3 billion (2017 USD) in damage from 81 tornadoes, becoming the second-largest January tornado outbreak and the third-largest winter tornado outbreak since 1950 as well as the largest outbreak on record in Georgia. The outbreak was also the second-deadliest outbreak in January since 1950.
  - January 21 – An EF3 tornado in Mississippi killed four people, injured 57 others, and caused $9 million (2017 USD) in damage, while tearing through William Carey University and Hattiesburg, Mississippi on its 31.3 mi (50.4 km) path.
  - January 22 – An EF3 tornado in Georgia killed 11 people and injured 45 others, while passing south of Adel, Georgia, along a 24.88 mi (40.04 km) path.
  - January 22 – An EF3 rain-wrapped wedge (2,200 yards wide) tornado in Georgia killed five people, injured 40 others, and caused $300 million (2017 USD) in damage along its 70.69 mi (113.76 km) path. The National Weather Service issued tornado emergency when it passed through Albany, Georgia.

=== February ===
- February 7 – A tornado outbreak, across the Southeastern United States, killed one person, injured 40 others, and caused over $175 million (2017 USD) in damage from 15 tornadoes.
  - February 7 – An EF3 tornado in New Orleans, Louisiana injured 33 people and caused $2.7 million (2017 USD) in damage along its 10.09 mi (16.24 km) path.
- February 23-24 - Record heat surges into the Northeastern United States. On February 24, New York City sees a February record warm low of 58 °F (14 °C). Boston saw a record monthly high of 73 °F (23 °C). Albany, which hit 74 °F (23 °C), saw its warmest temperature in meteorological winter on record. The day before, Syracuse tied a monthly record high, at 69 °F (21 °C).
- February 25 – Five tornadoes touch down in Pennsylvania, Maryland, and Massachusetts, including an EF1, which became the first Massachusetts tornado on record during the month of February.
- February 28–March 1 – A tornado outbreak, across the Central United States, Ohio Valley, Eastern United States and Southern United States, killed four people, injured 68 people (38 tornadic and 30 non-tornadic), and caused $1.3 billion (2017 USD) in damage.

=== March ===
- March 6–7 – A tornado outbreak across the Central United States injured 19 people from 63 tornadoes.
- March 9–18 – A blizzard across North America, unofficially named Winter Storm Stella, Blizzard Eugene, and Blizzard of 2017, killed 16-19 people and caused over 100,000 power outages. The storm system also spawned three tornadoes in Florida and wind gusts of 138 mph (222 km/h) were reported on Mount Washington, New Hampshire.

=== May ===
- May 15-20 - A tornado outbreak sequence killed 2 people and injured 38 more from 134 tornadoes.
- May 19 - Both LaGuardia Airport and Burlington, Vermont tie record high temperatures for the month of May, at 97 °F (36 °C) and 93 °F (34 °C) respectively.

=== July ===
- July 15 – Flash floods near Payson, Arizona killed ten people and injured four others.

=== August ===
- August 6 – Four tornadoes around Tulsa, Oklahoma injured 30 people and caused $50.24 million (2017 USD) in damage.
- August 17 – September 2 – Hurricane Harvey kills 103 people due to extreme flooding in Texas. It also kills one in Guyana, two in Arkansas, one in Tennessee and one in Kentucky. Overall it causes 108 deaths and $125 billion in damages, tying it with Hurricane Katrina as the costliest hurricane.
- August 30 - September 12 - Hurricane Irma strikes the Caribbean Sea and Southeastern United States, causing 134 deaths and over $77.8 billion.

=== September ===
- September 16-30 - Hurricane Maria makes landfall in the Windward Islands and Puerto Rico, killing 3,059 and causing $91.6 billion in damages.
- September 25-27 - Syracuse, New York experienced its latest in-year heat wave, with temperatures hitting 90 °F (32 °C) on September 25 and 27 and 91 °F (33 °C) on September 26.

=== October ===
- October 28-29 - Tropical Storm Philippe caused 5 deaths and $100 million in damage across Central America and Florida.
- October 28-31 - A storm complex causes $100 million and 1.3 million power outages.

=== December ===
- December 23, 2017 – January 19, 2018 – A cold wave caused damaging low temperatures across eastern North America. The cold wave also caused Tallahassee, Florida to receive trace amounts of frozen precipitation for the first time in more than 30 years.

Global weather by year
Preceded by 2016	Weather of 2017	Succeeded by 2018
