= Parthenon, Arkansas =

- Unincorporated community
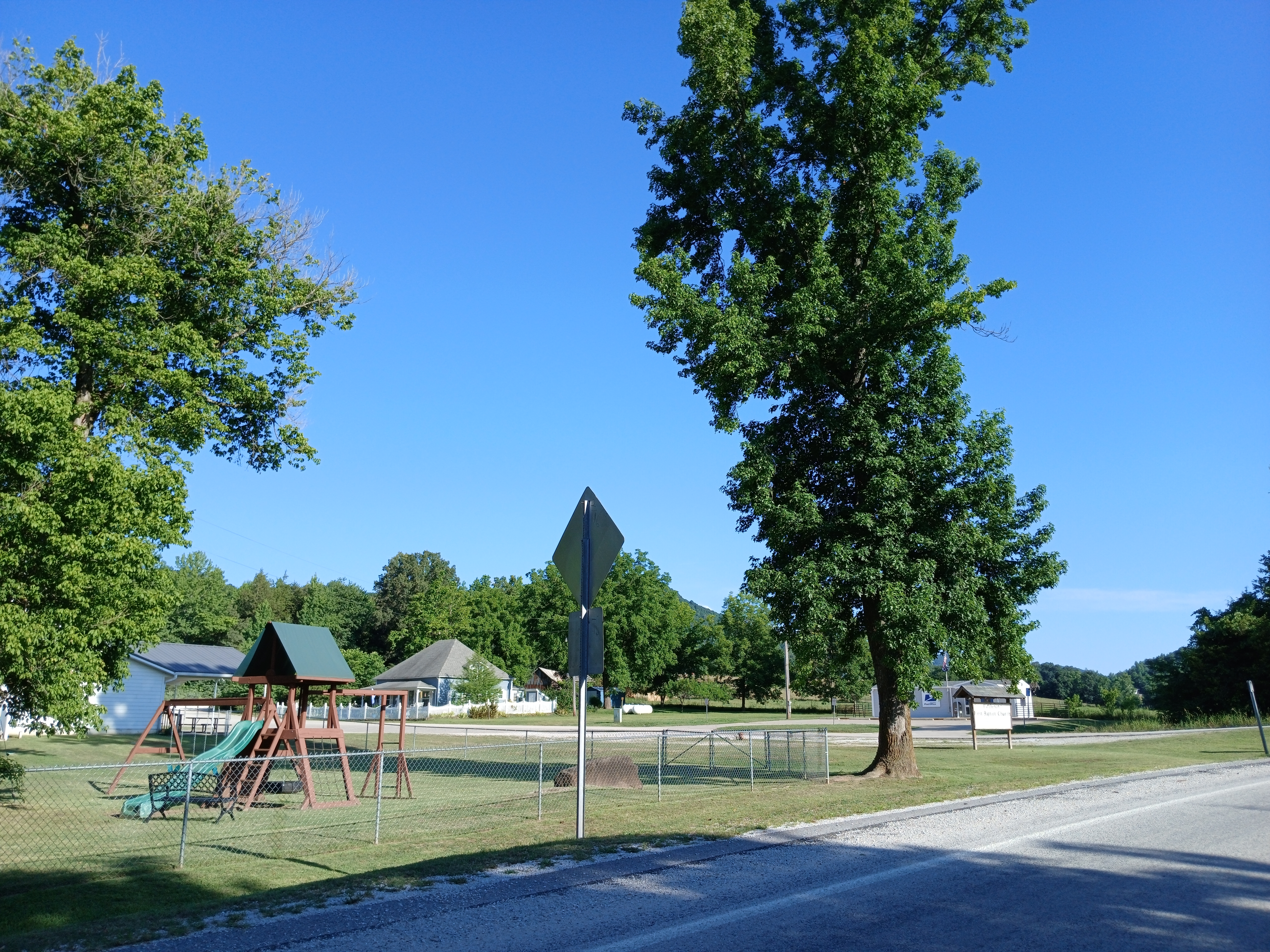
- July 2024

- Location within Arkansas Location within the United States
- Coordinates: 35°57′11″N 93°14′32″W
- Country: United States
- State: Arkansas
- County: Newton
- Elevation: 929 ft (283 m)
- Time zone: UTC-6 (Central (CST))
  - Summer (DST): UTC-5 (CDT)
- ZIP code: 72666
- Area code: 870
- GNIS feature ID: 77959

Parthenon is an unincorporated community in Newton County, Arkansas, United States. Parthenon is located on Arkansas Highway 327, 5 miles (8.0 km) southwest of Jasper. Parthenon has a post office with ZIP code 72666.

An EF2 tornado destroyed the city's post office and damaged nearby structures on March 7, 2017.
