= Tornado outbreak of February 28 – March 1, 2017 =

Weather event in the United States

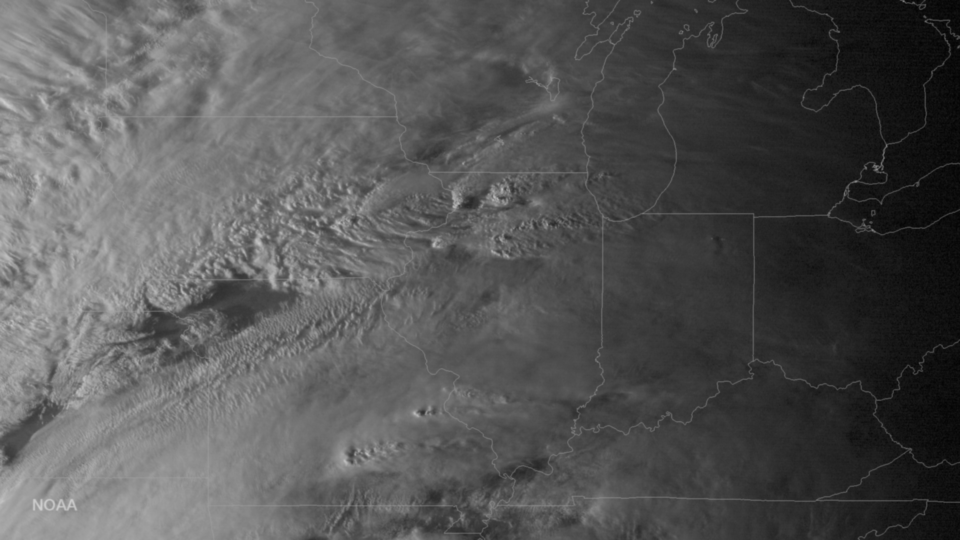
- GOES 13 satellite images of the supercells associated with the tornado outbreak at 23:15 UTC on February 28, 2017

Meteorological history
- Duration: February 28 - March 1, 2017

Tornado outbreak
- Tornadoes: 71 confirmed
- Max. rating: EF4 tornado
- Duration: 23 hours, 19 minutes
- Highest winds: Tornadic – 180 mph (290 km/h) (Perryville, Missouri EF4 on February 28)
- Highest gusts: Non-tornadic – Non-tornadic: 95 mph (153 km/h) west of East Chicago, Indiana
- Largest hail: 4.50 inches (114 mm) near Monnie Springs, Arkansas

Overall effects
- Fatalities: 4
- Injuries: 38 (+30 non-tornadic injuries)
- Damage: $1.3 billion (2017 USD)
- Areas affected: Central United States, Ohio Valley, Eastern United States, Southern United States
- Part of the 2016–17 North American winter and tornado outbreaks of 2017

The tornado outbreak of February 28 – March 1, 2017 was a widespread and significant outbreak of tornadoes and severe weather that affected the Midwestern United States at the end of February 2017 and beginning of March. Fueled by the combination of ample instability, strong wind shear, and rich low-level moisture, the event led to 71 confirmed tornadoes and thousands of other non-tornadic severe weather reports. The most notable aspect of the outbreak was a long-tracked EF4 tornado—the first violent tornado of 2017 and the first violent tornado during the month of February since the 2013 Hattiesburg tornado—that tracked from Perryville, Missouri to near Christopher, Illinois, killing one person. Three EF3 tornadoes were recorded during the event, including one that caused two fatalities in Ottawa, Illinois, one that caused a fatality near Crossville, and one that heavily damaged or destroyed homes in and around Washburn. In addition to the deaths, 38 people were injured by tornadoes and an additional 30 were injured by non-tornadic impacts, mainly by fallen trees.

== Meteorological synopsis ==
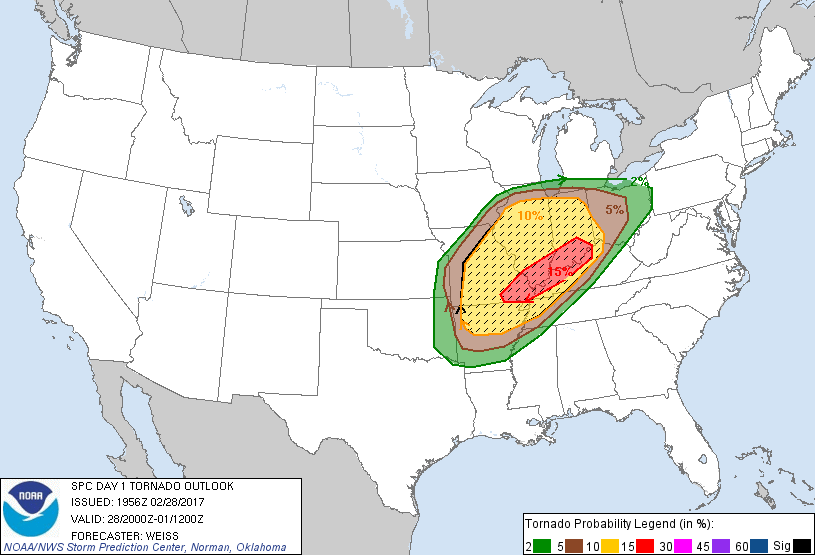
The Storm Prediction Center's 20z tornado outlook on February 28, 2017

The first indications of a severe weather event came on February 24, when the Storm Prediction Center (SPC) issued a threat area across Arkansas and portions of the lower Mississippi Valley valid for February 28. The threat level was maintained for Arkansas and surrounding states in the subsequent outlook, while a new risk area was introduced from northern Louisiana to southwestern Kentucky valid for March 1. Despite significant variance among model guidance, the SPC issued a day 3 Enhanced risk over the Ozark Plateau into southeastern Missouri, encompassed by much broader Slight and Marginal risk areas. The next day, an Enhanced risk was introduced portions of the Mid-South and Ohio River Valley in anticipation of a widespread damaging wind event on March 1. On February 28, the SPC introduced a Moderate risk of severe weather across portions of eastern Missouri, central and southern Illinois, central and southern Indiana, into western and northern Kentucky. The organization warned of supercell thunderstorm development and the potential for "nocturnal significant tornadoes." As the storm system spread east on March 1, a Moderate risk was briefly added across central Kentucky and middle Tennessee into the Cumberland Gap. The setup for a widespread tornado outbreak came as a 115 mph (185 km/h) mid- to upper-level trough progressed eastward from the Great Basin and lower Colorado River Valley to the Mississippi Valley on February 28. With large-scale height falls, three rounds of severe weather were expected to evolve across the Midwestern United States: elevated thunderstorms across northern Illinois early in the day, significant supercell development throughout the evening and overnight hours, and a quasi-linear convective system throughout the overnight hours into March 1. At the surface, an area of low pressure developed near the Missouri–Iowa border and progressed into southern Michigan late on February 28. A cold front, meanwhile, extended from the Plains to the Mississippi Valley, and a warm front lifted northward across Illinois. In the warm sector ahead of the cold front, rich low-level moisture surged northward, with dewpoints of 65–70 °F (18–21 °C) observed across Texas and Louisiana. Although a strong subtropical jet stream allowed a widespread cirrus plume to overspread the risk area, limiting surface heating in some locations, mid-level CAPE values were still expected to reach upward of 1500–2000 J/kg. Combined with ample moisture, steep mid-level lapse rates, and sufficient destabilization, effective bulk shear near or over 80 mph (130 km/h), was expected to yield storm relative helicity values in excess of 300–400 m2/s2. However, the driving mechanism for convection across the risk area was still somewhat uncertain given the confluence of a weak capping inversion, warm-air advection, and negligible ascent.

The first signs of convective activity came around 19:45 UTC, when shallow cumulus development was observed across Arkansas. A half hour later, at 20:15 UTC, the SPC issued their first tornado watch across portions of Kansas, Missouri, and Illinois, the first of many watches issued throughout the afternoon and overnight hours. The first significant tornado touched down at 22:41 UTC, causing extensive damage along a path from Naplate to northwest of Marseilles, Illinois, most notably the city of Ottawa, with that tornado being rated EF3. There, two deaths were recorded and fourteen people were injured. Two other EF3 tornadoes were documented during the outbreak: one near Washburn, Illinois, and the other from Crossville, Illinois to Oakland City, Indiana that caused one fatality as well that traveled 44 miles and was produced by the same supercell as the Perryville tornado. The strongest event was an EF4 tornado that traveled more than 50 miles (80 km) from Perryville, Missouri to southwest of Christopher, Illinois that killed one person, making it the first violent tornado of 2017, and the first since an EF4 tornado struck near Chapman, Kansas on May 25, 2016. In total, 72 tornadoes were confirmed during the outbreak. This outbreak would be followed by another outbreak which affected many of the same areas only 5 days later.

== Confirmed tornadoes ==
Confirmed tornadoes by Enhanced Fujita rating
EFU	EF0	EF1	EF2	EF3	EF4	EF5	Total
0	17	42	8	3	1	0	71

=== February 28 event ===
List of confirmed tornadoes – Tuesday, February 28, 2017 (Note: All dates are based on the local time zone where the tornado touched down; however, all times are in Coordinated Universal Time for consistency.)
EF#	Location	County / Parish	State	Start Coord.	Time (UTC)	Path length	Max width
EF1	SW of Castleton to SE of Bradford	Stark, Bureau	IL	41.1113°N 89.7134°W	22:12–22:20	5.53 mi (8.90 km)	100 yd (91 m)
EF1	Minor tree, outbuilding, and house damage occurred in and around the town of Castleton. Minor damage to crops and tree branches occurred near Bradford as well.						
EF0	NW of Cedar Point	LaSalle	IL	41.2785°N 89.1627°W	22:27–22:30	1.75 mi (2.82 km)	50 yd (46 m)
EF0	Storm spotter photos and videos confirmed a tornado. No damage occurred.						
EF3	W of Naplate to NW of Marseilles	LaSalle	IL	41.3239°N 88.9504°W	22:41–22:59	11.5 mi (18.5 km)	800 yd (730 m)
EF3	2 deaths – This strong multiple-vortex tornado first significantly damaged a nursing home and the LaSalle County Highway Department building at high-end EF2 strength. The tornado then reached EF3 intensity and caused major structural damage to many homes and other buildings in Naplate, including a glass plant that was partially destroyed. One home in town was blown off its foundation and left with only interior walls intact, with a nearby vehicle thrown 30 yards. The tornado weakened to EF1 strength as it moved through the southern part of Ottawa, damaging many homes and trees before dissipating near Marseilles. Two men in Ottawa were killed by a falling tree, and fourteen other people were injured. This was the northernmost February EF3 tornado on record in Illinois.						
EF1	NE of Marseilles	LaSalle	IL	41.3648°N 88.7066°W	22:58–23:02	2.8 mi (4.5 km)	200 yd (180 m)
EF1	This high-end EF1 tornado caused considerable damage to two farmsteads. Grain bins were destroyed, semi-trailers were rolled over, tree branches were snapped, and a boat was moved. A farm house had major roof damage. Power poles were slightly bent over, and a communications tower was damaged as well.						
EF0	NNE of Seneca	Grundy	IL	41.3753°N 88.5841°W	23:04–23:06	1.2 mi (1.9 km)	200 yd (180 m)
EF0	Video evidence of a tornado was relayed, with debris found along Interstate 80.						
EF1	SSE of Daysville	Ogle	IL	41.9478°N 89.3098°W	23:07–23:09	1.5 mi (2.4 km)	50 yd (46 m)
EF1	Farm equipment was toppled, outbuildings were collapsed, homes had their roofs damaged, and large branches were snapped off of trees. This was the northernmost February tornado on record in Illinois.						
EF0	N of Peoria	Peoria	IL	40.8645°N 89.6086°W	23:10–23:11	0.07 mi (0.11 km)	25 yd (23 m)
EF0	A tornado briefly touched down in a field.						
EF0	Rome	Peoria	IL	40.878°N 89.5212°W	23:15–23:17	0.89 mi (1.43 km)	100 yd (91 m)
EF0	A few buildings and several trees were damaged. Total economic losses were estimated at $75,000.						
EF3	W of Washburn to Rutland	Woodford, Marshall, LaSalle	IL	40.9128°N 89.3609°W	23:26–23:50	17.77 mi (28.60 km)	600 yd (550 m)
EF3	West of Washburn, this strong tornado struck multiple farmsteads, destroying barns, outbuildings, and grain bins as well as damaging several homes. A house at one farmstead sustained high-end EF3 damage, being completely leveled with the subflooring partially collapsed into the basement. This home was bolted to its foundation, though a vehicle parked in the garage was not moved, preventing a higher rating. Another home had its roof ripped off, while a third sustained shingle and window damage. The tornado then struck the northern part of Washburn at high-end EF2 strength, ripping roofs off of many well-built homes, a few of which sustained some failure of exterior walls. One home in town had a car thrown into it. Several additional farmsteads sustained EF2 damage east of Washburn before the tornado weakened to EF1 strength and struck Rutland, where minor tree and roof damage occurred before the tornado dissipated. Many trees were snapped and uprooted along the path. Total economic losses were estimated at $2,000,000.						
EF0	Folletts	Clinton	IA	41.7535°N 90.3582°W	23:53	0.04 mi (0.064 km)	25 yd (23 m)
EF0	An emergency manager reported a brief tornado in a farm field. No damage occurred.						
EF2	WSW of Long Point	LaSalle, Livingston	IL	40.9856°N 88.9865°W	23:53–23:59	4.5 mi (7.2 km)	75 yd (69 m)
EF2	Trees were snapped or uprooted. One home had its entire roof ripped off and sustained some collapse of exterior walls.						
EF1	WNW of Lesterville	Reynolds	MO	37.4409°N 90.9138°W	00:40–00:48	4.36 mi (7.02 km)	80 yd (73 m)
EF1	A camper and many trees were damaged.						
EF1	Higginson	White	AR	35.1900°N 91.7300°W	01:03–01:05	1.37 mi (2.20 km)	120 yd (110 m)
EF1	Numerous trees were snapped or uprooted, power lines were downed, vehicles were flipped, and highway signs were snapped at the base as a result of this high-end EF1 tornado. Several homes sustained damage to their roofs, including a few that sustained total removal of their roofs. Four people were injured. Total economic losses were estimated at $50,000.						
EF2	Kensett	White	AR	35.2220°N 91.6800°W	01:07–01:09	1.1 mi (1.8 km)	250 yd (230 m)
EF2	Multiple homes sustained damage along the path. A few homes sustained collapse of exterior walls, one of which was largely destroyed. A mobile home was destroyed, and shops and outbuildings were damaged as well. One person was injured. Total economic losses were estimated at $70,000.						
EF0	N of Silver Mine to NNW of Oak Grove	Madison	MO	37.5777°N 90.4997°W	01:16–01:22	4.44 mi (7.15 km)	50 yd (46 m)
EF0	Trees were snapped and toppled, several gravestones were moved or downed, and a large hay barn sustained structural damage.						
EF4	N of Silver Lake, MO to SW of Christopher, IL	Perry (MO), Randolph (IL), Jackson (IL), Franklin (IL)	MO, IL	37.7238°N 90.0055°W	01:51–02:57	53.47 mi (86.05 km)	1,100 yd (1,000 m)
EF4	1 death – See article on this tornado – 12 people were injured. Total economic losses were estimated at $14,800,000.						
EF1	Niles	Berrien	MI	41.8310°N 86.2407°W	01:54–01:56	0.57 mi (0.92 km)	100 yd (91 m)
EF1	A tornado touched down near Eastside Elementary School. Numerous trees and homes were damaged across a five block area in town, with some trees landing on homes and vehicles, and a City of Niles public works maintenance building was damaged as well.						
EF1	N of Pokagon to Dowagiac	Cass	MI	41.9478°N 86.1760°W	01:58–02:02	4.99 mi (8.03 km)	100 yd (91 m)
EF1	A tornado touched down in an open field and tracked into Dowagiac. Two single-wide mobile homes were destroyed, multiple homes sustained minor damage, and widespread tree damage occurred.						
EF1	S of Vandalia	Cass	MI	41.8782°N 85.9497°W	02:12–02:15	2.7 mi (4.3 km)	150 yd (140 m)
EF1	Several large trees were snapped or uprooted, and chain link fence was pulled from the ground. The Calvin Center Seventh-day Adventist Church had siding and shingles ripped off. A single-wide mobile home had its roof ripped off, a garage had its roof partially torn off, and a two-story house was shifted on its foundation and sustained damage to its roof. Other houses sustained minor roof and siding damage.						
EF1	E of Centreville	St. Joseph	MI	41.9176°N 85.4913°W	02:38–02:40	2.04 mi (3.28 km)	50 yd (46 m)
EF1	Several trees were damaged; one penetrated the roof of a shed while a second crushed part of an RV trailer. A second RV trailer was pushed over, a large barn and smaller outbuilding both sustained roof damage, and a residence had its shingles damaged.						
EF1	E of Coleta	Whiteside	IL	41.8883°N 89.7512°W	02:44–02:46	2.62 mi (4.22 km)	75 yd (69 m)
EF1	Pine trees were snapped and farm outbuildings were damaged. A home had its and a part of its garage's roof removed. A second house also sustained roof damage.						
EF1	Versailles	Brown	IL	39.8845°N 90.6636°W	03:33–03:34	0.66 mi (1.06 km)	50 yd (46 m)
EF1	Two single-wide mobile home trailers were overturned. Numerous trees were snapped or uprooted. Many structures sustained roof, siding, and fascia damage. One person was injured.						
EF1	W of Cherry	Bureau	IL	41.4151°N 89.2608°W	03:43–03:46	2.33 mi (3.75 km)	50 yd (46 m)
EF1	Although damage was mainly to trees, a farm shed was completely destroyed.						
EF3	SW of Crossville, IL to S of Oakland City, IN	White (IL), Posey (IN), Gibson (IN)	IL, IN	38.16°N 88.06°W	03:55–04:47	44.13 mi (71.02 km)	440 yd (400 m)
EF3	1 death – See section on this tornado – Two people were injured. Total economic losses were estimated at $5,700,000.						
EF0	Boydsville to Lynn Grove	Graves, Calloway	KY	36.5021°N 88.5311°W	04:35–04:47	8.8 mi (14.2 km)	30 yd (27 m)
EF0	Hundreds of trees were snapped, several were uprooted, and several barn roofs sustained minor damage.						
EF1	WNW of Farlington	Crawford	KS	37.6503°N 94.9603°W	04:37–04:38	0.1 mi (0.16 km)	75 yd (69 m)
EF1	One outbuilding was destroyed and two others were heavily damaged. Farm equipment items were heavily damaged or thrown.						
EF1	SE of Carterville	Williamson	IL	37.7385°N 89.0626°W	04:44–04:54	7.36 mi (11.84 km)	25 yd (23 m)
EF1	A tornado produced mainly tree damage, with a few uprooted and many limbs broken.						
EF0	NNE of Farlington	Crawford	KS	37.63°N 94.82°W	04:43–04:44	0.1 mi (0.16 km)	75 yd (69 m)
EF0	Two carports were destroyed, and two homes were damaged. A tree was downed.						
EF2	WSW of Ireland	Dubois	IN	38.42°N 87.00°W	05:03–05:08	4.1 mi (6.6 km)	200 yd (180 m)
EF2	A large pole barn was destroyed and multiple homes sustained extensive damage as a result of this high-end EF2 tornado, including one house with its roof ripped off and walls partially collapsed.						
EF1	NE of Linton	Trigg	KY	36.7365°N 87.8813°W	05:28–05:38	8.58 mi (13.81 km)	400 yd (370 m)
EF1	Hundreds of trees were snapped or uprooted, a grain bin was destroyed, numerous barns sustained major structural damage, and many homes sustained roof and siding damage.						

=== March 1 event ===
List of confirmed tornadoes – Wednesday, March 1, 2017
EF#	Location	County / Parish	State	Start Coord.	Time (UTC)	Path length	Max width
EF0	NNW of Buffalo	Dallas	MO	37.6839°N 93.1067°W	06:30–06:31	1 mi (1.6 km)	100 yd (91 m)
EF0	Several trees snapped and downed. Several barns and outbuildings sustained damage, including one that was completely destroyed. A truck sustained severe damage from flying debris, and a home sustained severe roof damage.						
EF1	SE of Rochester	Butler	KY	37.184°N 86.88°W	06:35–06:37	0.78 mi (1.26 km)	90 yd (82 m)
EF1	Trees were snapped, uprooted, and twisted, and one building was damaged.						
EF1	W of Lebanon	Laclede	MO	—N/a	06:56	0.1 mi (0.16 km)	200 yd (180 m)
EF1	A frame home and two mobile homes sustained minor roof damage. Numerous trees were snapped or uprooted.						
EF1	S of Lamar	Johnson	AR	35.4203°N 93.3852°W	07:29–07:30	0.14 mi (0.23 km)	200 yd (180 m)
EF1	A home sustained severe roof damage.						
EF0	S of Leesburg	Highland	OH	39.2991°N 83.5968°W	07:31–07:39	6.87 mi (11.06 km)	250 yd (230 m)
EF0	One barn was destroyed, a second was partially collapsed, and a third had its top half removed. Several outbuildings were heavily damaged or destroyed. A garage was destroyed, a fence was flattened, and several houses sustained minor damage. Numerous trees were snapped or uprooted.						
EF0	SW of Greenfield	Highland	OH	39.2754°N 83.4669°W	07:40–07:45	4.53 mi (7.29 km)	100 yd (91 m)
EF0	Several trees were snapped or downed, a small unanchored shed was removed from its foundation, and a barn had part of its roof ripped off.						
EF1	ENE of Cleveland	Conway	AR	35.4372°N 92.6235°W	08:16–08:17	1 mi (1.6 km)	250 yd (230 m)
EF1	The door of an outbuilding was uplifted, causing significant damage to the roof. Another outbuilding was pushed off its foundation and severely damaged. Several trees were uprooted.						
EF0	W of Austin	Conway	AR	35.4439°N 92.5602°W	08:18–08:19	1.1 mi (1.8 km)	50 yd (46 m)
EF0	A roof was damaged, and a few barns were destroyed.						
EF1	SE of Higden	Cleburne	AR	35.4617°N 92.2345°W	08:33–08:38	3.9 mi (6.3 km)	250 yd (230 m)
EF1	Many trees were snapped, downed, or uprooted. A home had its windows blown out and roof damaged. Several outbuildings were damaged as well.						
EF1	Amelia	Clermont	OH	39.0258°N 84.2955°W	08:38–08:47	6.39 mi (10.28 km)	150 yd (140 m)
EF1	Numerous trees and a few power poles were snapped by this high-end EF1 tornado that moved directly through Amelia. One home had its roof completely lifted off and displaced while other houses sustained damage to their shingles and siding.						
EF1	S of Possum Grape	Jackson	AR	35.4538°N 91.4619°W	09:13–09:17	4.24 mi (6.82 km)	200 yd (180 m)
EF1	Numerous large trees were snapped or uprooted by this high-end EF1 tornado, including one that crushed a tractor. Several homes sustained mainly roof damage; one had most of its roof removed.						
EF1	SE of Diaz	Jackson	AR	35.6362°N 91.2627°W	09:20–09:22	1.6 mi (2.6 km)	125 yd (114 m)
EF1	High-end EF1 tornado snapped and uprooted many trees and snapped power poles. A few residences sustained structural damage, and home had the back of a garage blown out and part of the roof removed. Road signs and a storage building were destroyed as well.						
EF2	S of Washington	Daviess	IN	38.5991°N 87.1394°W	10:00–10:01	0.15 mi (0.24 km)	30 yd (27 m)
EF2	A brief tornado caused considerable damage to a home's attached garage, which had its garage doors and exterior walls blown out. A pole barn was destroyed as well.						
EF1	SW of Montgomery	Daviess	IN	38.66°N 87.08°W	10:00	0.03 mi (0.048 km)	25 yd (23 m)
EF1	A brief tornado snapped and uprooted multiple trees.						
EF2	S of Montgomery	Daviess	IN	38.6573°N 87.0782°W	10:05–10:06	1.52 mi (2.45 km)	30 yd (27 m)
EF2	A brief tornado snapped very large trees and collapsed a metal truss tower that was built on a two-legged base.						
EF0	W of Carbondale	Jackson	IL	37.7013°N 89.3705°W	10:08–10:13	4.11 mi (6.61 km)	25 yd (23 m)
EF0	A few trees were uprooted and large tree branches were downed.						
EF1	SE of Montgomery	Daviess	IN	38.6443°N 87.0011°W	10:10–10:11	0.04 mi (0.064 km)	30 yd (27 m)
EF1	A brief tornado lifted a garage off of its foundation and destroyed it. A camper was lofted 30 yards (27 m) and destroyed as well.						
EF1	W of Mitchell	Lawrence	IN	38.7281°N 86.5129°W	10:30–10:31	0.21 mi (0.34 km)	40 yd (37 m)
EF1	Roofing from a barn and a house were tossed 100 yd (91 m). Insulation was scattered, the east wall of the house and garage was displaced, a lamp post was broken, trees were uprooted.						
EF2	NW of Saltillo	Lawrence, Orange	IN	38.69°N 86.3406°W	10:37–10:39	0.68 mi (1.09 km)	25 yd (23 m)
EF2	Three metal chicken barns were collapsed, some outbuildings and barns were damaged or destroyed, and two mobile homes were destroyed while another was rolled over onto a vehicle. One person was injured.						
EF1	SSE of Sikeston to NNE of Anniston	New Madrid, Mississippi	MO	36.8203°N 89.5762°W	10:40–10:52	15.21 mi (24.48 km)	200 yd (180 m)
EF1	A garage was completely destroyed, with the associated home sustaining roof damage. Several barns were damaged, dozens of trees were snapped or uprooted, numerous power poles were snapped, and dozens of irrigation systems were blown over. One person was injured.						
EF0	Dyersburg	Dyer	TN	36.0422°N 89.3566°W	10:51–10:54	3.71 mi (5.97 km)	50 yd (46 m)
EF0	One barn sustained significant damage while a second had its roof ripped off. A home sustained shingle damage, and outbuildings were damaged. Intermittent tree damage was observed.						
EF1	NE of Saltillo	Washington	IN	38.681°N 86.28°W	10:41–10:47	5.8 mi (9.3 km)	100 yd (91 m)
EF1	Hundreds of trees were snapped or uprooted. Several outbuildings were heavily damaged or destroyed. Several residences were damaged either by flying debris or by tornadic winds.						
EF2	W of Crothersville	Jackson	IN	38.7991°N 86.0166°W	10:45–10:46	0.25 mi (0.40 km)	50 yd (46 m)
EF2	A garage was lifted up and partially off its foundation, resting it atop a pickup truck. A frame home had a majority of its roof ripped off. A 25 ft (8.3 yd) trailer was lifted and flipped onto its side. The tornado was embedded within straight-line winds up to 115 mph (185 km/h) that collapsed three metal transmission towers.						
EF1	Borden	Clark	IN	38.468°N 85.952°W	11:04–11:05	0.33 mi (0.53 km)	20 yd (18 m)
EF1	Numerous trees were snapped or uprooted in town. An old building, a garage, a house, and a church all sustained roof damage.						
EF1	SSW of Scottsburg	Scott	IN	38.627°N 85.784°W	11:05–11:07	2.15 mi (3.46 km)	125 yd (114 m)
EF1	A large cinderblock building had one of its walls collapsed, and two metal outbuildings were destroyed. One unanchored mobile home was destroyed while a second was flipped. A large garage was destroyed, a double-wide manufactured home was pushed off its foundation, and numerous trees were snapped or uprooted. Three people were injured.						
EF2	E of Cuba	Graves	KY	36.5827°N 88.6263°W	11:25–11:27	1.55 mi (2.49 km)	200 yd (180 m)
EF2	This tornado was embedded in a larger area of straight-line winds. A frame home was heavily damaged and had much of its roof torn off. At a cemetery, many headstones weighing hundreds of pounds were blown over, some of which were thrown up to 30 ft (10 yd) away and driven into the ground. A nearby church sustained damage to its roof. A machine shed was completely swept away, and a mobile home was shifted and damaged. Dozens of trees were snapped or uprooted as well.						
EF1	NNE of Campbellsburg	Henry	KY	38.553°N 85.211°W	11:36–11:38	1.08 mi (1.74 km)	200 yd (180 m)
EF1	Numerous barns, a large grain bin, and a few smaller outbuildings were destroyed, and an anchored mobile home was pushed off its foundation. Trees were snapped or uprooted and a truck was overturned.						
EF0	Anderson Township	Hamilton	OH	39.0699°N 84.3925°W	12:03–12:04	1.05 mi (1.69 km)	350 yd (320 m)
EF0	Numerous trees were snapped or uprooted, many of which fell on homes and caused damage. Approximately 50 homes were damaged in the Anderson Township area.						
EF1	S of New Market	Highland	OH	39.1078°N 83.6814°W	12:39–12:41	2.19 mi (3.52 km)	150 yd (140 m)
EF1	Three barns and a dog kennel sustained significant roof removal, and other outbuildings sustained lesser damage. A house sustained minor roof damage and several broken windows, as well partial siding loss. Trees were snapped or downed.						
EF1	E of Adairville	Logan	KY	36.659°N 86.835°W	12:57–12:59	1.57 mi (2.53 km)	75 yd (69 m)
EF1	A house sustained minor roof damage, trees were downed, a small outbuilding was damaged, and a large barn lost a significant portion of its roof structure.						
EF1	NNW of Franklin to SE of Brentwood	Williamson	TN	35.9545°N 86.883°W	13:00–13:09	10.48 mi (16.87 km)	250 yd (230 m)
EF1	This tornado moved through the southern suburbs of Nashville, including Cool Springs. Roughly 500 homes and businesses were damaged, and many trees were downed, some of which landed on structures. Small outbuildings were also destroyed. Carrie Underwood's house was hit by the tornado, and had its chimney blown off while tree limbs were also downed on the property. A Lexus dealership had its doors blown in, a hotel sustained minor damage, and an auto shop had its garage doors blown in as well.						
EF0	Northern Lavergne	Davidson, Rutherford	TN	36.0398°N 86.5971°W	13:17–13:20	3.15 mi (5.07 km)	100 yd (91 m)
EF0	The Four Corners Marina sustained extensive damage to its docks, boats, and shelters as well, and small outbuildings were destroyed. Sporadic tree damage occurred, and several homes sustained minor damage.						
EF1	NW of Waverly	Pike	OH	39.1583°N 83.0228°W	13:16–13:17	0.57 mi (0.92 km)	125 yd (114 m)
EF1	Many trees were snapped or uprooted, three outbuildings were destroyed, one house sustained partial roof removal, and a second house sustained minor structural damage.						
EF1	SE of Bowling Green	Warren	KY	36.906°N 86.273°W	13:24–13:28	2.63 mi (4.23 km)	125 yd (114 m)
EF1	Numerous sheds, metal buildings, dog houses, and other outbuildings were destroyed by this high-end EF1 tornado. One home had its back wall bent inward while its roof was severely damaged. Several vehicles were slid and moved. Numerous trees were snapped, uprooted, and twisted. Several other homes sustained various degrees of roof and porch damage. A 300 lb (140 kg) fuel tank was blown over.						
EF0	W of Watertown	Wilson	TN	36.0971°N 86.2501°W	13:37–13:41	3.32 mi (5.34 km)	100 yd (91 m)
EF0	Dozens of trees were snapped or uprooted, and an outbuilding was destroyed.						
EF1	N of Watertown	Wilson, Smith	TN	36.0989°N 86.1678°W	13:40–13:48	7.17 mi (11.54 km)	200 yd (180 m)
EF1	A home and garage sustained significant damage, although the garage was not properly attached to the foundation. Two TVA high transmission power poles were snapped. Several other houses sustained minor roof and tree damage, including a greenhouse that was completely destroyed, and numerous trees were downed. A large swath of straight-line wind damage associated with rear flank downdraft winds caused widespread tree and structural damage along U.S. Highway 70 in Watertown.						
EF1	S of Hickman	Smith	TN	36.1167°N 85.9809°W	13:51–13:56	3.91 mi (6.29 km)	200 yd (180 m)
EF1	An old home being used as a storage building was destroyed, and two site-built homes and a mobile home sustained minor exterior damage. A barn was destroyed, a second barn was damaged, and many trees were downed.						
EF1	S of Bloomington Springs	Putnam	TN	36.1461°N 85.7526°W	14:02–14:13	7.62 mi (12.26 km)	150 yd (140 m)
EF1	Dozens of large trees were snapped and uprooted, and small outbuildings were destroyed. A few houses sustained minor roof damage.						
EF1	N of Langsville	Meigs	OH	39.0577°N 82.1854°W	14:07–14:08	0.05 mi (0.080 km)	300 yd (270 m)
EF1	Several trees were snapped or uprooted. A small aluminum shed was ripped off its wooden foundation, blown to the northeast, and mangled. A porch was ripped off a home, landing on the other side. A large barn had its roof ripped off and two side walls collapsed.						
EF1	E of Monterey	Putnam	TN	36.15°N 85.2377°W	14:35–14:36	0.11 mi (0.18 km)	90 yd (82 m)
EF1	A few outbuildings were destroyed, a house sustained minor structural damage, and large trees were snapped or uprooted.						
EF1	NW of Chatsworth	Murray	GA	34.7755°N 84.8207°W	21:27–21:31	2.88 mi (4.63 km)	150 yd (140 m)
EF1	A barn was destroyed, and a semi trailer was overturned at a tractor trailer storage facility. Numerous trees were snapped or uprooted. An industrial building had a large section of its roof peeled back, and an apartment complex sustained significant shingle damage. At a baseball field, a fence was downed, a cinder block wall was toppled, bleachers were tossed onto the field, and the press box was damaged. A carport was collapsed onto a car and home.						

=== Perryville, Missouri/Vergennes–Elkville–Mulkeytown, Illinois ===
Perryville, Missouri/Vergennes–Elkville–Mulkeytown, Illinois
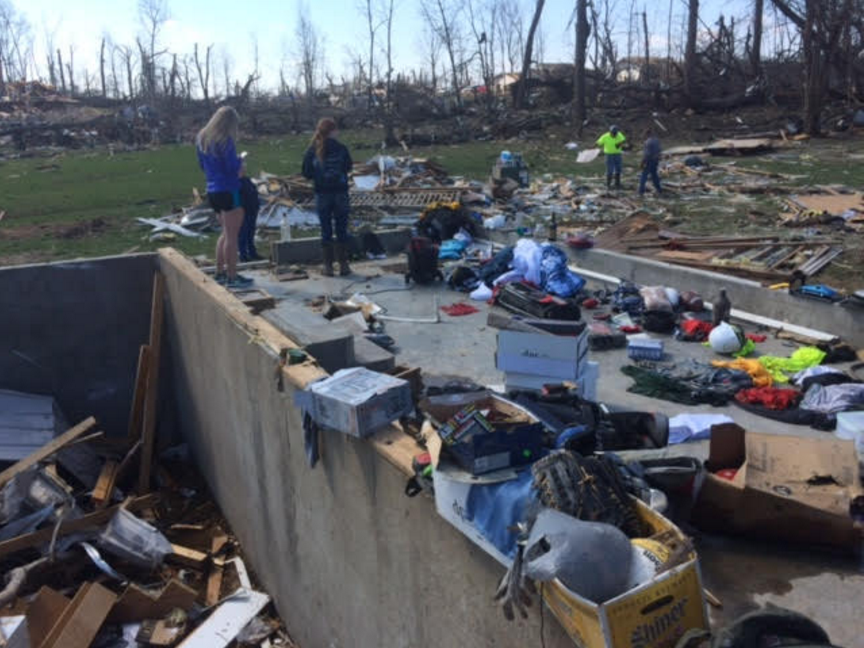
- EF4 damage to a home in Perryville, Missouri.

Meteorological history
- Formed: February 28, 2017, 7:51 p.m. CST (UTC−06:00)
- Dissipated: February 28, 2017, 8:57 p.m. CST (UTC−06:00)
- Duration: 1 hour, 6 minutes

EF4 tornado
- on the Enhanced Fujita scale
- Highest winds: 180 mph (290 km/h)

Overall effects
- Fatalities: 1
- Injuries: 12
- Damage: $14.8 million (2017 USD)

This violent EF4 tornado began at 7:51 p.m. CST (01:51 UTC) to the west of Perryville in Perry County, Missouri, where it snapped the trunks of several hardwood trees and caused EF1 damage to homes. An outbuilding was destroyed at EF2 intensity near the intersection of Country Road 810 and North Highway. The tornado then continued to the northeast and intensified at an exceptional rate, causing EF4 damage as it impacted a small subdivision of large homes on the west side of I-55. Multiple two-story homes along Kyle Lane were completely leveled. One person was killed in their vehicle as the tornado crossed I-55, and least a dozen cars were mangled and destroyed after being thrown 200–300 yards (180–270 m) from a nearby salvage yard. The tornado then moved across a series of open pastures before crossing US 61 and impacting the northwestern outskirts of Perryville at EF4 intensity. A residential subdivision along Moore Drive in this area sustained devastating damage, with many homes completely leveled, a few of which were swept clean from their foundations. Numerous trees in this area were snapped and denuded, and several vehicles were flipped and tossed. One home in this area was anchor-bolted to its foundation with its wall studs' toe-nailed at both the top and bottom and was completely swept away with only the basement left behind. Despite the high-quality construction, the overall context surrounding this home was not indicative of an intensity greater than mid-range EF4, and maximum winds along this segment of the path were estimated to have peaked at 180 mph (290 km/h).

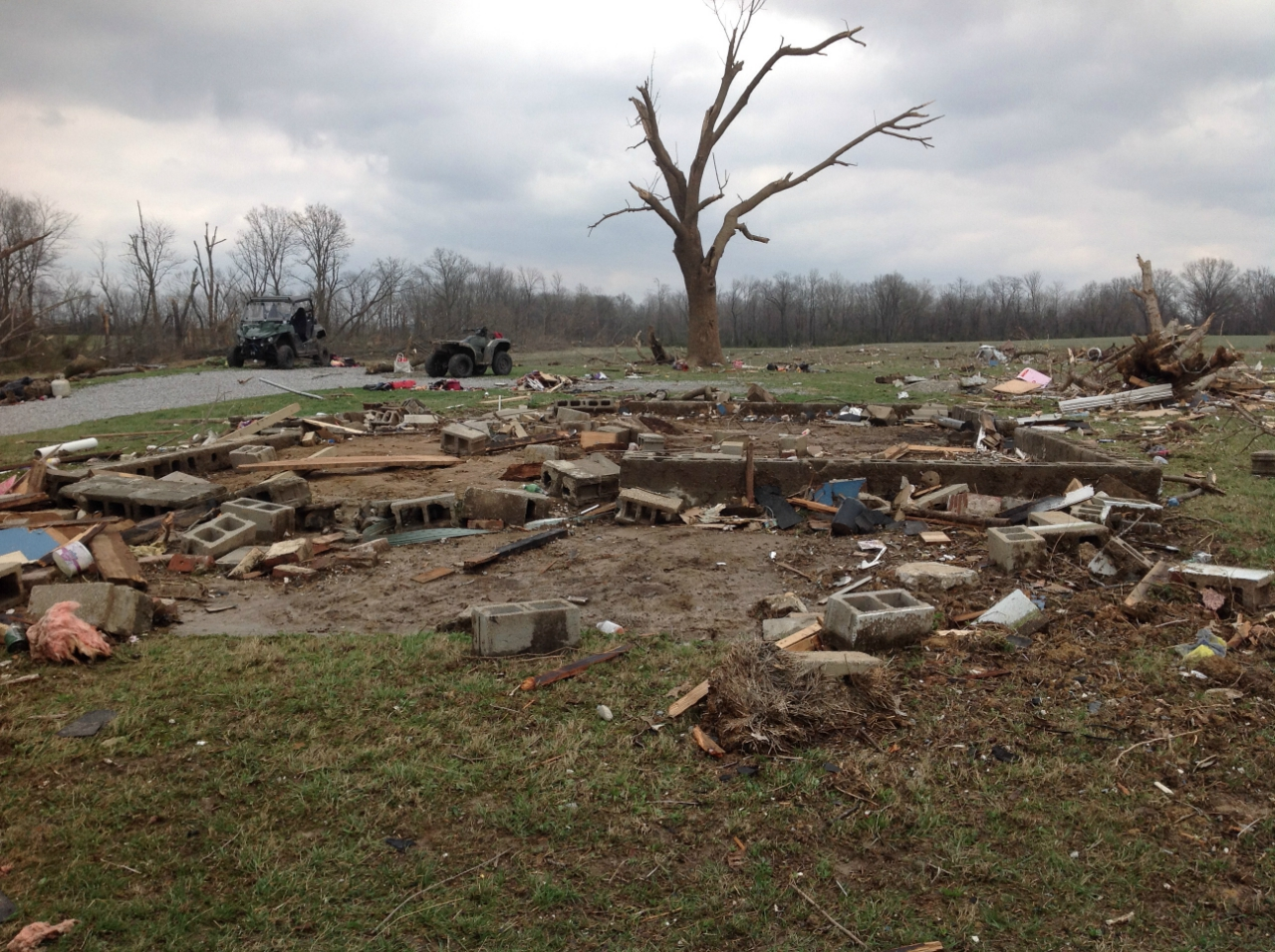
High-end EF3 damage to a farmhouse to the south of Mulkeytown, Illinois.

The tornado weakened to high-end EF2 strength as it crossed Country Road 906, destroying a garage and collapsing the exterior walls of a residence. As the tornado continued through sparsely populated areas further to the northeast, it produced a mixture of EF2 and EF3 damage to homes. A few homes along this portion of the path were left with only a single interior room standing, and multiple outbuildings were destroyed. Large hay bales from one of the outbuildings were thrown up to 50 yards away. As the tornado crossed the Mississippi River into Illinois, trees along the riverbank were shredded and debarked. The tornado took on a multiple-vortex structure at this point, as evidenced by multiple distinct ground striations in nearby fields, and also attained its peak width of 0.6 miles (0.97 km). Once in Illinois, the tornado continued at EF2 strength as it passed south of Rockwood, snapping hundreds of trees and a few power poles. A house at the edge of the damage path sustained EF0 roof damage. Past Rockwood, the tornado tore through the Shawnee National Forest, downing thousands of trees at EF1 to EF2 strength as it continued to the northeast. EF1 and EF2 damage continued to the south of Ava, as numerous trees were snapped and uprooted and several outbuildings were completely destroyed. East of Ava, many trees, mobile homes, and frame homes sustained considerable damage, and additional outbuildings were destroyed as damage continued to range from EF1 to EF2 in intensity. The tornado then passed through the southern outskirts of Vergennes, completely destroying a house at EF3 intensity. Outbuildings and large grain silos were destroyed, and trees and power poles were snapped just south of town as well.

Continuing northeastward past Vergennes, EF2 damage occurred as a small home was largely destroyed, power poles were snapped, outbuildings were destroyed, an antenna was bent, and a dump truck was flipped over. EF2 damage continued as the tornado clipped the northern fringes of Elkville, with multiple homes and outbuildings severely damaged or destroyed in that area. The Powerade Park baseball field complex was also damaged, and many trees were snapped. EF1 damage to trees was observed further to the northeast as the tornado traversed unpopulated swampy areas. The tornado passed south of Campbell Lake and then moved into Franklin County, where it dramatically re-intensified to high-end EF3 strength as it crossed IL 184, south of the community of Mulkeytown. A farmhouse at this location was obliterated and swept cleanly away, with the debris shredded and scattered one mile (1.6 km) downwind. National Weather Service damage surveyors were unable to recover anything larger than a few wooden 2x4s and some pieces of siding downwind from the foundation. Nearby trees were snapped and denuded as well. Due to the intensity of the damage, the damage at this location was initially assigned an EF4 rating. However, further surveys revealed that the home was not attached to its cinder block foundation, and the rating was subsequently decreased to high-end EF3. Beyond this point, the tornado weakened to EF1 intensity and caused moderate damage to some homes and outbuildings before it lifted at 8:57 p.m. CST (02:57 UTC) to the southwest of Christopher. With a total path length of 53.47 miles (86.05 km), it was the longest-tracked tornado in the county warning area of the Paducah, Kentucky National Weather Service office in 36 years. In addition to the one fatality, twelve people were injured.

=== Crossville, Illinois/Poseyville–Fort Branch–Oakland City, Indiana ===
Crossville, Illinois/Poseyville–Fort Branch–Oakland City, Indiana
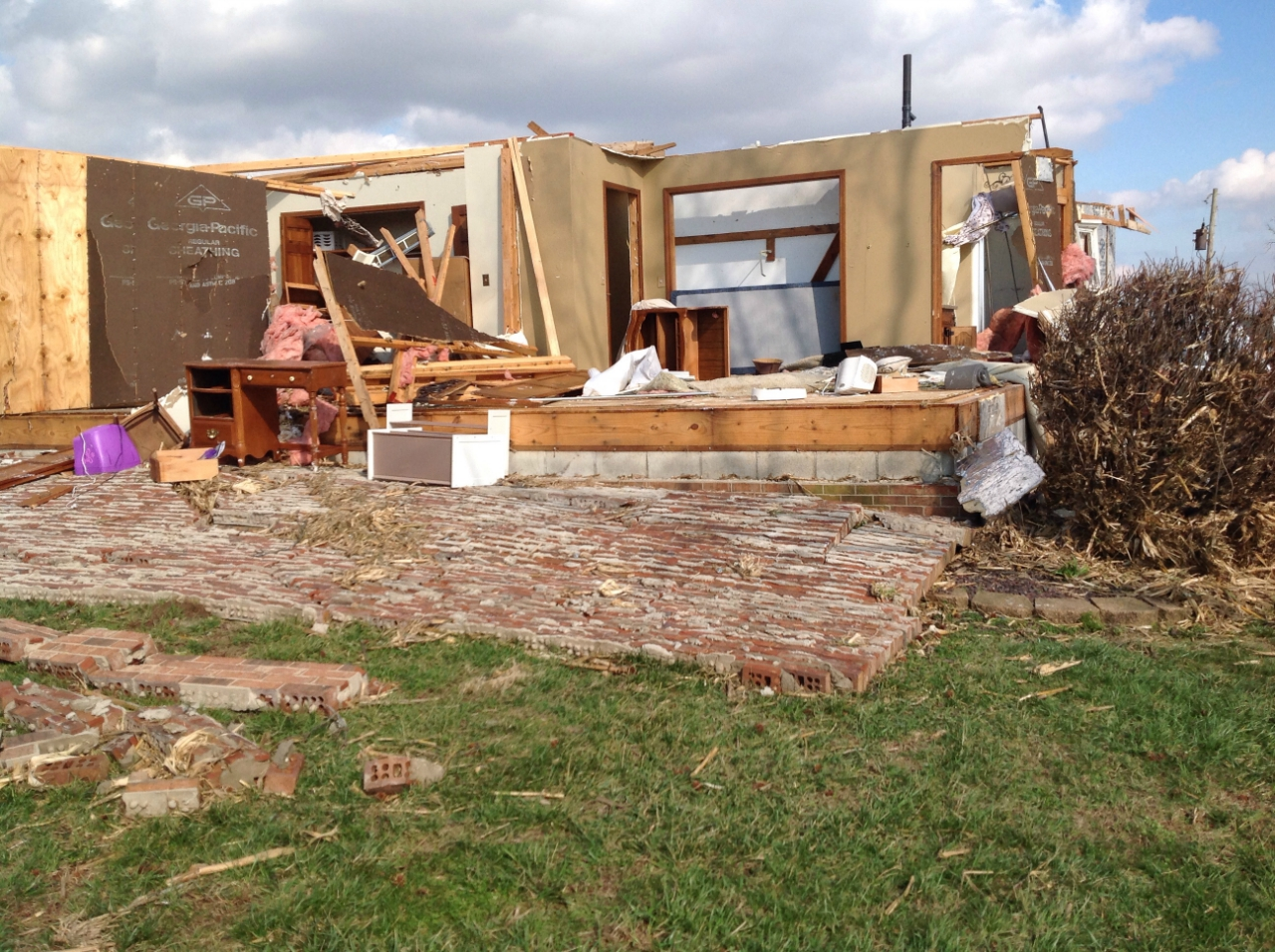
- EF3 damage to a house in Gibson County, Indiana.

Meteorological history
- Formed: February 28, 2017, 9:55 p.m. CST (UTC−06:00)
- Dissipated: February 28, 2017, 10:47 p.m. CST (UTC−06:00)
- Duration: 52 minutes

EF3 tornado
- on the Enhanced Fujita scale
- Highest winds: 152 mph (245 km/h)

Overall effects
- Fatalities: 1
- Injuries: 2
- Damage: $5.7 million (2017 USD)

This intense tornado touched down just northeast of Carmi in White County, Illinois at 9:55 p.m. CST (03:55 UTC), snapping the trunks of hardwood trees at EF1 strength. It rapidly intensified to EF3 strength farther to the east as it crossed IL 1, completely destroying a single-wide mobile home and rolling four to five vehicles. A residence was moved about 3 feet (1.0 yd) off its foundation, with a majority of its second floor swept away, a four-wheeler flipped upside down, a refrigerator tossed atop the rubble, and an associated garage completely destroyed. A small brick outbuilding nearby was severely damaged, a double-wide mobile home was obliterated, and several power poles were snapped in this area as well. The tornado then crossed 1675 East Street and North 1750 East Street, narrowly missing the city of Crossville to the south. EF3 damage was again inflicted to a residence that sustained major damage to its structure, had its garage destroyed, and had a vehicle rolled about 30 yards (27 m). Just past 1800 East Street, one small barn storing farm equipment was decimated while a larger outbuilding had its main support beams break loose from the concrete pads, forcing the roof beams to buckle. Damage to these structures was rated EF2. Another large barn nearby was severely damaged and a small brick outbuilding was destroyed, with damage to those structures rated EF1.

Farther along the path, the tornado re-intensified to EF3 strength as it crossed at the North 1935 East Road and East 1975 North Road intersection to the north of Phillipstown. The old part of a home, which had to be rebuilt after being hit by the 1925 Tri-State tornado, was destroyed while the newer part of the structure was damaged. A vehicle from this residence was thrown 30 yards (27 m). Several other structures in this area sustained EF2 damage, including a house that had its roof torn off, two double-wide mobile homes that were destroyed with nearby vehicles displaced, and an outbuilding that was completely destroyed. A house at the edge of the circulation had some of its metal roofing removed as well. The tornado continued towards the Wabash River, downing numerous trees at EF1 intensity as it moved through unpopulated areas. In total, 35 structures were damaged in the county.

The tornado crossed the Wabash River into Posey County, Indiana and restrengthened to EF2 intensity, obliterating two metal barns. It veered east-southeast but quickly back east-northeast, causing severe damage to many hardwood trees along its path. Southeast of Griffin, a free-standing light pole was collapsed. The storm narrowed after crossing I-64, but continued to produce EF2 damage to a barn that was flattened. Along Pumpkin Run Road, multiple power poles were snapped, while along Murphy Road, a residence sustained damage to its roof. A nearby house was completely shifted off its foundation, with nearby hardwood trees snapped and uprooted. As the tornado passed north of Poseyville into Gibson County, wooden power poles were snapped and large amounts of debris was strewn throughout a treeline along SR 165. A pocket of EF3 damage was noted as a metal building was totally destroyed with its foundation swept clean. Cars at the structure were tossed 15 yards (14 m), 6x6 poles were snapped at the concrete, and two double-wide mobile homes were destroyed with their metal frames tossed 50–75 yards (46–69 m). An anchor-bolted frame home had one of its walls, its windows, and its stella doors blown out. Another nearby home had a large section of its roof ripped off, sustaining EF2 damage. Along South County Road 1075 West, EF2 damage continued as power poles were snapped, a mobile home was destroyed, and hundreds of trees were snapped and uprooted. Continuing northeast, a steel barn was destroyed and hundreds of additional trees were snapped. The tornado then produced another area of EF3 damage as it destroyed a brick home. The house had its roof ripped off, exterior walls collapsed, and had its attached garage destroyed. An occupant of this home was left trapped in the debris after the tornado and had to be dug out.

Farther along the path, the tornado weakened back to EF2 strength as a residence to the southeast of Owensville had its entire roof destroyed and sustained damage to its concrete block walls, while several nearby outbuildings were damaged. EF2 damage continued as it crossed SR 168 to the west of Fort Branch, tearing off large sections of roof from homes and crumpling large grain bins. The tornado weakened as it affected areas just north of Fort Branch, but still caused considerable high-end EF1 roof damage to several homes and downed many trees. To the northeast of Fort Branch, EF1 damage continued as homes sustained roof damage, including a brick home that lost about 1/4 of its roof. A metal building had part of its roof ripped off and walls pushed in along South County Road 550 East, while a final pocket of EF2 damage was noted farther along the path just west of I-69, where a barn was completely destroyed. The final observed damage was to a barn south of Oakland City that had half of its roof torn off and gable blown out at 10:47 p.m. CST (04:47 UTC), marking an end to the tornado's 44.6 miles (71.8 km) path. Damage to this last structure was rated EF1. In all, 106 structures were damaged in Gibson County, of which 33 suffered minimal damage, 26 suffered minor damage, 21 suffered major damage, and 26 were destroyed. One person was killed, and two others were injured by this tornado, all in Illinois.

== See also ==
- Weather of 2017
- List of North American tornadoes and tornado outbreaks
- List of F4 and EF4 tornadoes
  - List of F4 and EF4 tornadoes (2010–2019)
- Tornado outbreak of March 2–3, 2012 – An early March outbreak which produced multiple long-tracked and destructive tornadoes across the Ohio Valley
- Tornado outbreak of March 6–7, 2017 – A less severe, but still significant tornado outbreak that affected similar areas just one week later
