= Tornado outbreak of March 6–7, 2017 =

Natural disaster in the United States

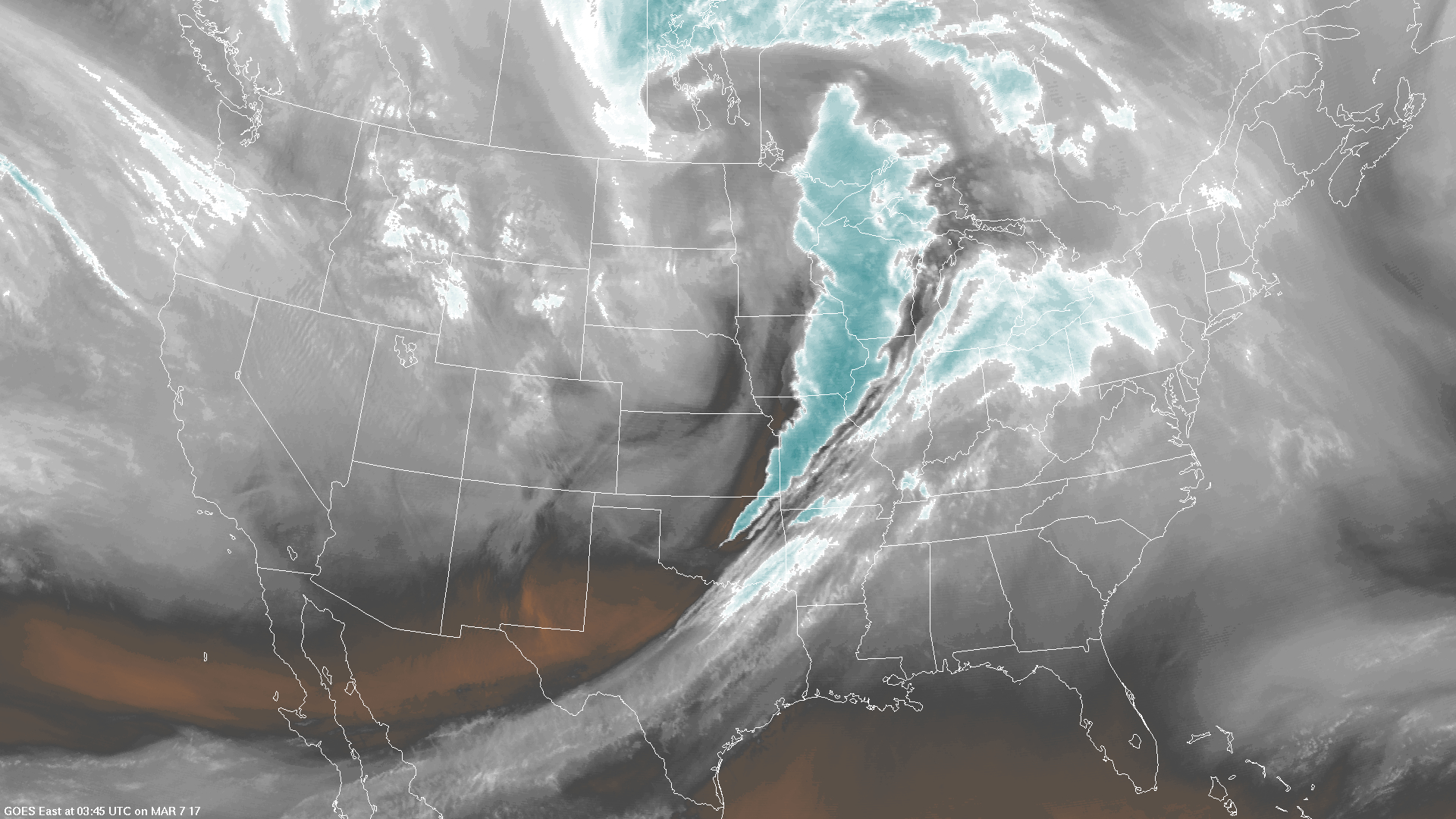
- The extratropical cyclone on March 7 with storms extending from Oklahoma to Ontario

Meteorological history
- Formed: March 6, 2017
- Dissipated: March 7, 2017

Tornado outbreak
- Tornadoes: 63
- Max. rating: EF3 tornado
- Duration: 9 hours, 33 minutes
- Highest winds: Tornadic: 150 mph (240 km/h) in Oak Grove, Missouri; Non-tornadic: 90 mph (140 km/h) in Belle Plaine, Iowa
- Largest hail: 2.75 in (7.0 cm) diameter near Trimble, Missouri and Edgerton, Missouri

Overall effects
- Injuries: 19
- Damage: $2.2 billion (2017 USD)
- Areas affected: Central United States
- Part of the 2016–17 North American winter and tornado outbreaks of 2017

The tornado outbreak of March 6–7, 2017 was a widespread severe weather and tornado outbreak that affected portions of the Midwestern United States in the overnight hours of March 6–7. Occurring just days after a deadly and more significant event across similar areas just a week prior, this particular outbreak led to 63 tornadoes within a 9 1/2-hour period as a quasi-linear convective system and discrete supercell thunderstorms traversed the region. The most notable aspect of the outbreak was an EF3 tornado that damaged or destroyed hundreds of structures within Oak Grove, Missouri, injuring 12 people but causing no fatalities. An EF1 tornado touched down near Bricelyn, the earliest known tornado on record in the state of Minnesota. Outside of tornadic activity, hundreds of damaging wind reports and a multitude of severe hail reports were documented.

== Meteorological synopsis ==
On March 2, the Storm Prediction Center (SPC) highlighted the forecast evolution of an upper-level trough and the potential for severe thunderstorms across portions of the southern Plains and the lower Mississippi River Valley valid for day 5/March 6. However, limited moisture return and low forecaster confidence prevented the delineation of a severe weather threat area at that time. The organization again omitted a threat area for the same period the next day, citing unpredictability in the duration and severity of strong thunderstorms. On March 4, the SPC outlined a Marginal risk of severe weather from northeastern Texas northward into extreme portions of southern Minnesota and southwestern Wisconsin. The next morning, a Slight risk was introduced across portions of northeastern Oklahoma, southeastern Kansas, much of Missouri, and northwestern Arkansas. Accounting for increased confidence in supercellular thunderstorm development ahead of a quasi-linear convective system (QLCS), a small Enhanced risk of severe weather was indicated across portions of northwestern Arkansas and southern Missouri during the afternoon hours of March 5. This risk area was expanded the day of the event, including a 10% hatched tornado probability area across southeastern Kansas and south-central Missouri where the SPC noted, "large hail and tornadoes, some of which may be significant, will be the primary risks with any supercells that can maintain discrete mode immediately ahead of a probable QLCS."

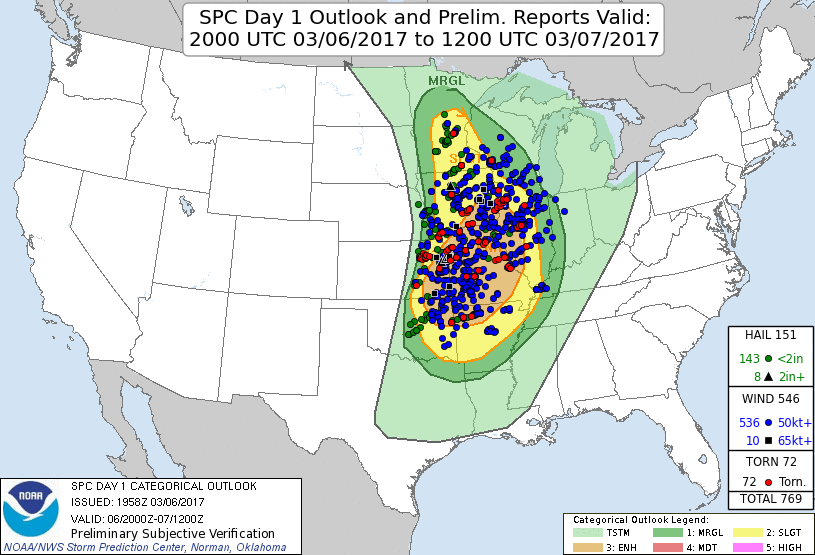
Preliminary verification of the SPC's 20:00 UTC convective outlook

On the heels of a significant tornado outbreak that affected much of the same areas the week before, this event came to fruition as a synoptic upper-level trough tilted northwest to southeast from the Alaska Panhandle into the Four Corners region. A strong shortwave trough on the base of the synoptic feature was expected to phase with a second shortwave over Utah, collectively progressing across the northern and central Plains throughout March 6. The northern half of the trough, meanwhile, was expected to evolve into a closed low in the middle levels of the atmosphere as it lifted into The Dakotas and then on up to southern Canada. At the surface, a rapidly-deepening area of low pressure (expected to fall to near 978 mb (28.9 inHg) by 00:00 UTC on March 7) was noted across South Dakota, with a cold front extending southward into New Mexico and a warm front extending eastward into the Great Lakes region. A dry line extended from central South Dakota down to northern Mexico. Both the cold front and the dry line were expected to track eastward throughout the day, with the former feature expected to overtake portions of the latter in eastern Kansas by the evening hours. Despite widespread low-level clouds in the warm sector, limiting the amount of atmospheric instability, mid-level Convective Available Potential Energy (CAPE) values were expected to rise to around 2000 J/kg across the western Ozarks and up to 500 J/kg as far north as north-central Minnesota. Partially modified Gulf moisture, with dewpoints in the 60s F across the Enhanced risk and 50s F farther north, was expected to combine with steep mid-level lapse rates of 7–7.5 C/km to destabilize the environment.

Although a capping inversion across the risk area limited convection throughout the day and despite the main forcing passing north of the highest risk area, two regimes were expected to evolve: a quasi-linear convective system along the cold front and the formation of discrete supercells ahead of said line. With strong effective bulk wind shear up to 65–75 mph (105–121 km/h), effective storm relative helicity of 250–400 m2/s2, and even higher 0–1 km storm relative helicity values of 500–600 m2/s2, the environment became primed for a widespread severe weather and tornado outbreak. The first tornado watch of the day was issued at approximately 17:55 UTC across portions of Iowa, and several other watches were also issued across the Midwest before the final watch issued for portions across the Mid-South expired at 16:00 UTC on March 7. In total, the SPC logged 35 filtered reports of tornadoes, 352 filtered reports of damaging winds, and 98 filtered reports of severe hail. A vast majority of tornadoes that occurred during this outbreak were spawned by semi-discrete supercell structures and embedded mesovortices within a larger quasi-linear convective system, as development of true discrete supercell thunderstorms throughout the event was somewhat limited. However, a few isolated supercell thunderstorms did develop over northern Arkansas and southern Missouri during the late night hours of March 6 into the early morning hours of March 7. One of these isolated supercells produced a long-track EF2 tornado that struck Parthenon, Arkansas and caused heavy damage. The most significant event of the outbreak was an EF3 tornado that moved directly through Oak Grove, Missouri, damaging or destroying hundreds of structures and injuring 12 people. No fatalities occurred as a result of this outbreak, but 19 people were injured.

== Confirmed tornadoes ==
Confirmed tornadoes by Enhanced Fujita rating
EFU	EF0	EF1	EF2	EF3	EF4	EF5	Total
0	24	29	9	1	0	0	63

=== March 6 event ===
List of confirmed tornadoes – Monday, March 6, 2017 (Note: All dates are based on the local time zone where the tornado touched down; however, all times are in Coordinated Universal Time for consistency.)
EF#	Location	County / Parish	State	Start Coord.	Time (UTC)	Path length	Max width	Summary
EF1	NW of Bricelyn to N of Walters	Faribault	MN	43.5701°N 93.8204°W	23:04–23:15	9.32 mi (15.00 km)	200 yd (180 m)	Trees were uprooted, power poles were snapped, and homes sustained roof and window damage. Garages, barns, and sheds were heavily damaged or destroyed as well. The most concentrated area of damage occurred at a campground, with an unanchored mobile home being lofted and moved 15 feet at that location. This was the earliest known Minnesota tornado on record in the calendar year.
EF0	NW of Lanyon to SE of Harcourt	Webster	IA	42.2348°N 94.2041°W	23:23–23:26	2.38 mi (3.83 km)	30 yd (27 m)	A storm chaser observed a small tornado lofting dust and debris into the air. No significant damage occurred.
EF1	E of Harcourt to NW of Dayton	Webster	IA	42.272°N 94.1476°W	23:28–23:32	2.87 mi (4.62 km)	50 yd (46 m)	A firefighter documented a brief tornado lofting dust and debris into the air. A hog house had its roof removed and most of its walls collapsed.
EF0	S of Manhattan	Geary	KS	39.0539°N 96.5376°W	23:35	0.1 mi (0.16 km)	50 yd (46 m)	A semi truck was blown off the road by this brief tornado.
EF0	E of Manhattan to S of St. Marys	Wabaunsee	KS	39.1548°N 96.3829°W	23:36–00:00	16.06 mi (25.85 km)	50 yd (46 m)	An intermittent tornado touched down several times, causing no damage.
EF0	N of Louisville	Pottawatomie	KS	39.2934°N 96.32°W	23:37	0.01 mi (0.016 km)	25 yd (23 m)	Emergency management relayed visual confirmation of a tornado. No damage occurred.
EF0	N of Volland	Wabaunsee	KS	39.0079°N 96.4°W	23:37–23:38	0.12 mi (0.19 km)	50 yd (46 m)	Video evidence of a tornado was received. No damage occurred.
EF1	SW of Clarks Grove to NE of Geneva	Freeborn, Steele	MN	43.7356°N 93.3505°W	23:38–23:51	14.22 mi (22.88 km)	300 yd (270 m)	This tornado first struck Clarks Grove, where a large warehouse building had walls collapsed and a large section of roof removed. Flying debris from this structure damaged surrounding buildings and vehicles, trees in town were snapped, and a large brick building had windows blown out. The tornado struck Geneva before dissipating, where trees and detached garages were damaged. Numerous barns, outbuildings, and garages were damaged or destroyed along the path.
EF1	W of Zimmerman	Sherburne	MN	45.4287°N 93.6925°W	23:39–23:55	8.78 mi (14.13 km)	300 yd (270 m)	Numerous trees were snapped, outbuildings were destroyed, and a boat was damaged. A few residences sustained minor to significant roof damage, some of which occurred as a result of falling trees and tree limbs.
EF0	W of Paxico	Wabaunsee	KS	39.07°N 96.1886°W	23:59–00:01	1.85 mi (2.98 km)	50 yd (46 m)	The roof of a barn was removed as a result of this weak tornado.
EF0	SE of Rossville	Shawnee	KS	39.1095°N 95.9236°W	00:13–00:21	5.21 mi (8.38 km)	50 yd (46 m)	A center pivot irrigation system was overturned. Minor tree damage was observed as well.
EF0	Mound City	Holt	MO	40.12°N 95.28°W	00:17–00:21	2.9 mi (4.7 km)	25 yd (23 m)	A few trees and power lines were downed in Mound City.
EF0	ENE of Luther to NE of Gilbert	Boone, Story	IA	41.9826°N 93.8958°W	00:27–00:44	17.86 mi (28.74 km)	85 yd (78 m)	Trees were uprooted or had branches snapped, power poles and outbuildings were damaged, a fifth wheel camper was flipped, and a house sustained minor shingle damage. The tornado was likely on the ground intermittently.
EF0	N of Skidmore	Nodaway	MO	40.31°N 95.09°W	00:30–00:36	5.8 mi (9.3 km)	25 yd (23 m)	The West Nodaway Fire Department reported a tornado. No damage occurred.
EF1	E of Garden City to W of Lawn Hill	Hardin	IA	42.2472°N 93.3327°W	00:58–01:04	6.32 mi (10.17 km)	300 yd (270 m)	A garage was mostly destroyed, a grain bin was damaged, and trees were uprooted or had large branches broken off.
EF0	WSW of Leon	Butler	KS	37.67°N 96.81°W	01:05–01:06	0.11 mi (0.18 km)	50 yd (46 m)	An outbuilding was slightly damaged.
EF2	N of Smithville to NE of Lathrop	Clay, Clinton	MO	39.428°N 94.5988°W	01:18–01:46	19.57 mi (31.49 km)	1,000 yd (910 m)	This high-end EF2 wedge tornado damaged or destroyed multiple homes along its path. One home was swept away with only the basement remaining, likely as a result of wind rushing into the home's basement garage. A split-level home had its second floor completely removed, a storage trailer was tossed and flipped over, and many outbuildings were destroyed. Other homes had roofs ripped off or were damaged to a lesser degree. Numerous trees and power poles were snapped along the path.
EF1	N of Liberty Center to SE of Milo	Warren	IA	41.2409°N 93.4915°W	01:19–01:24	4.83 mi (7.77 km)	100 yd (91 m)	A garage was destroyed, with debris lofted up to 150 yards (140 m), a residence had numerous windows blown out, and outbuildings were damaged or destroyed. Trees were uprooted and large branches were broken off as well.
EF1	NW of Melcher-Dallas to SSE of Pleasantville	Marion	IA	41.2765°N 93.291°W	01:29–01:34	5.33 mi (8.58 km)	120 yd (110 m)	A residence sustained damage to its roof and walls, an outbuilding was collapsed, and a silo was damaged.
EF1	SE of Pleasantville to S of Elk Rock State Park	Marion	IA	41.3469°N 93.2°W	01:35–01:42	6.76 mi (10.88 km)	80 yd (73 m)	Two residences sustained damage, one of which had a garage door collapsed and lost shingles. Numerous trees were snapped and large tree branches were broken.
EF1	Princeton	Franklin	KS	38.4881°N 95.2717°W	01:38–01:39	3.05 mi (4.91 km)	50 yd (46 m)	In the town of Princeton, tree and power line damage occurred. Outside of town, a majority of the roof was ripped off a home, a barn was destroyed, and outbuildings were damaged. A second house sustained minor roof damage as well.
EF1	SE of Cainsville to SW of Mercer	Mercer	MO	40.3938°N 93.753°W	01:40–01:51	10.34 mi (16.64 km)	100 yd (91 m)	A single-wide mobile home was rolled onto its side, a house sustained significant roof damage, numerous outbuildings were damaged, and trees were snapped.
EF0	E of Otley to N of Pella	Marion	IA	41.4611°N 92.9974°W	01:47–01:52	5.45 mi (8.77 km)	65 yd (59 m)	A small barn had its walls collapsed, trees were snapped or uprooted, and large tree branches were broken.
EF0	Leawood	Johnson	KS	38.8621°N 94.6249°W	01:51–01:52	0.32 mi (0.51 km)	100 yd (91 m)	Homes in a residential area near Leawood Ironwoods Park had small sections of their roofing and siding ripped off. Fences were destroyed as well.
EF1	Lee's Summit	Jackson	MO	38.9236°N 94.4079°W	02:03–02:06	2.29 mi (3.69 km)	25 yd (23 m)	A tornado primarily damaged trees, though a business sustained major roof and wall damage.
EF3	SW of Oak Grove to W of Odessa	Jackson, Lafayette	MO	38.959°N 94.2394°W	02:11–02:30	17.74 mi (28.55 km)	400 yd (370 m)	This destructive tornado moved directly through the town of Oak Grove, causing major damage. 483 homes and 10 businesses were damaged or destroyed, including a few poorly anchored homes that were leveled or swept from their foundations. Trees were downed and outbuildings were destroyed outside of town as well. Twelve people were injured, three of whom were hospitalized.
EF2	Seymour	Wayne, Appanoose	IA	40.6174°N 93.2085°W	02:16–02:29	14.92 mi (24.01 km)	250 yd (230 m)	A strong tornado touched down southwest of Seymour, inflicting major damage to trees and several farmsteads. The tornado then moved directly through town, where several homes and structures had roofs and walls ripped off. A brick school building also sustained major damage. The tornado exited Seymour and continued to the northeast, damaging a residence and farmstead before dissipating.
EF1	E of Cincinnati to NE of Exline	Appanoose	IA	40.6322°N 92.9041°W	02:30–02:37	8.01 mi (12.89 km)	60 yd (55 m)	A barn sustained roof damage, another barn had its doors collapsed, and trees were uprooted or had large branches broken.
EF2	S of Centerville to SE of Udell	Appanoose	IA	40.6891°N 92.876°W	02:33–02:42	9.66 mi (15.55 km)	90 yd (82 m)	This tornado first clipped the south side of Centerville, where a manufacturing facility sustained severe structural damage, several homes were damaged, and numerous power poles were snapped. Past Centerville, the tornado damaged a few other homes and outbuildings before dissipating near Udell.
EF1	Mayview	Lafayette	MO	39.0129°N 93.8511°W	02:34–02:36	1.75 mi (2.82 km)	50 yd (46 m)	Several structures sustained damage to their garage doors and external walls.
EF0	Southern Carrollton	Carroll	MO	39.3379°N 93.5154°W	02:40–02:46	5.97 mi (9.61 km)	100 yd (91 m)	A irrigation pivot was overturned southwest of town. In Carrollton, several structures were damaged, including a few businesses that lost a significant amount of roofing. The town's wooden welcome sign was destroyed as well. Barns and outbuildings were heavily damaged east of town before the tornado dissipated.
EF0	SW of Pilot Grove to SE of Boonville	Cooper	MO	38.8323°N 92.9597°W	02:40–02:56	17.45 mi (28.08 km)	400 yd (370 m)	Outbuildings and trees were damaged, while power poles were leant or downed.
EF1	N of Barre Mills to SSE of West Salem	La Crosse	WI	43.8564°N 91.1172°W	02:46–02:50	2.6 mi (4.2 km)	200 yd (180 m)	Intermittent damage occurred along the path. Barns and outbuildings were damaged or destroyed, and a farmhouse sustained roof damage.
EF1	NE of Brunswick to NW of Prairie Hill	Chariton	MO	39.4546°N 93.1085°W	02:56–03:16	19.81 mi (31.88 km)	100 yd (91 m)	Multiple outbuildings were destroyed, with debris scattered up to 200 yards away and wooden 2x4s speared into the ground. A house sustained minor damage, and trees were snapped and uprooted.
EF0	SE of Knob Noster to SW of La Monte	Johnson, Pettis	MO	38.7348°N 93.5327°W	03:10–03:17	3.88 mi (6.24 km)	25 yd (23 m)	Numerous outbuildings sustained major damage, several residences sustained minor damage, and many trees were snapped.
EF0	SE of Clinton	Henry	MO	38.3256°N 93.6878°W	03:17–03:26	7.79 mi (12.54 km)	25 yd (23 m)	Intermittent tornado caused minor damage along its path.
EF1	NE of Jacksonville to NE of Shelbina	Shelby	MO	36.6334°N 92.28°W	03:40–03:56	18.47 mi (29.72 km)	150 yd (140 m)	The South Shelby High School was affected, with minor roof damage, a couple of storage buildings destroyed, the baseball backstop destroyed, and the press box blown off the football field bleachers and destroyed. A nearby home had a portion of its roof ripped off. One person was injured by flying debris. Damage to trees and outbuildings occurred as well.
EF1	E of Bunch	Adair	OK	35.6562°N 94.7044°W	03:44–03:55	6.1 mi (9.8 km)	650 yd (590 m)	Tornado destroyed several outbuildings and an RV camper, caused minor damage to homes, and snapped or uprooted numerous trees. Power poles were downed as well.
EF0	SE of Bernard	Jackson, Dubuque	IA	42.2930°N 90.8302°W	03:50–03:55	5.7 mi (9.2 km)	25 yd (23 m)	A few outbuildings were destroyed, a manufactured home and a hog containment building had their roofs ripped off, and numerous trees suffered damage.
EF2	W of Grandview	Louisa	IA	41.2766°N 90.2594°W	03:56–03:57	0.31 mi (0.50 km)	150 yd (140 m)	A semi trailer was tipped over, wooden power poles were snapped, and trees were uprooted.
EF1	SSW of Quincy	Hickory	MO	37.9676°N 93.5021°W	04:00–04:01	0.75 mi (1.21 km)	100 yd (91 m)	Farm outbuildings were destroyed, and trees were uprooted.
EF2	Muscatine	Muscatine	IA	41.4092°N 91.0732°W	04:05–04:07	1.78 mi (2.86 km)	200 yd (180 m)	A short-lived but damaging tornado tracked through Muscatine, damaging more than 80 homes and several businesses. Two homes suffered total roof loss, one of which sustained collapse of exterior walls. Detached garages were destroyed, and light poles were snapped or bent to the ground. Many trees were downed along the path, and a church in downtown Muscatine sustained considerable damage.
EF2	W of Montpelier to E of Long Grove	Muscatine, Scott	IA	41.4528°N 90.8675°W	04:13–04:36	25.25 mi (40.64 km)	1,000 yd (910 m)	This strong wedge tornado narrowly missed the Quad Cities metropolitan area to the northwest. Many power poles were snapped, a house had its roof ripped off, numerous farm buildings were damaged or destroyed, and many trees were snapped or uprooted. A small free standing tower was bent over 1/3 from the top.
EF1	WSW of Bennett to NNE of Wheatland	Cedar, Clinton	IA	41.7468°N 90.99°W	04:18–04:31	16.63 mi (26.76 km)	100 yd (91 m)	A farm suffered the most severe damage, with all of the outbuildings and most of the trees destroyed. Other outbuildings, trees, and power lines sustained damage along the tornado's path.
EF2	NW of Walcott to E of Goose Lake	Scott, Clinton	IA	41.599°N 90.7988°W	04:19–04:46	34.68 mi (55.81 km)	200 yd (180 m)	A house had its roof blown off, another home sustained minor damage, outbuildings were damaged or destroyed, trees were snapped and uprooted, and several power poles were snapped as a result of this long-tracked tornado. Minor tree and structure damage occurred in the town of DeWitt.
EF1	S of Macks Creek	Camden	MO	37.9624°N 92.994°W	04:24–04:25	2 mi (3.2 km)	440 yd (400 m)	A mobile home, outbuildings, and trees were damaged. One person was injured.
EF0	S of Rocky Mount	Morgan	MO	38.2468°N 92.7159°W	04:36–04:37	0.33 mi (0.53 km)	50 yd (46 m)	Outbuildings and docks were damaged.
EF0	S of Low Moor	Clinton	IA	41.7503°N 90.3847°W	04:40–04:45	4.36 mi (7.02 km)	50 yd (46 m)	Trees and outbuildings were damaged. One home lost a part of its roof.
EF1	W of Combs	Washington, Madison	AR	35.8074°N 93.9938°W	04:51–05:02	6.4 mi (10.3 km)	400 yd (370 m)	Trees were snapped and uprooted. Chicken houses and a home were damaged.
EF1	NW of Erie	Whiteside	IL	41.7165°N 90.1358°W	04:53–05:01	1.54 mi (2.48 km)	10 yd (9.1 m)	This narrow tornado snapped trees and damaged or destroyed outbuildings along its path.
EF1	NW of Argyle to NE of Freeburg	Osage	MO	38.3007°N 92.0355°W	05:03–05:11	7.26 mi (11.68 km)	75 yd (69 m)	A hay barn was destroyed, and trees were snapped and uprooted.
EF1	Rhineland to SSE of Warrenton	Montgomery, Warren	MO	38.7166°N 91.5152°W	05:17–05:38	20.87 mi (33.59 km)	150 yd (140 m)	The roof of a building and fences on the grounds of a baseball field in Rhineland were damaged. Further along the path, varying amounts of damage was inflicted to several homesteads, farm buildings, and residences. Numerous trees were snapped and uprooted, and barns and garages were destroyed. A building at a private campground sustained roof damage as well.
EF2	N of Mossville to ENE of Saint Joe	Newton, Searcy	AR	35.9252°N 93.3880°W	05:38–06:27	36.64 mi (58.97 km)	700 yd (640 m)	This strong, long-tracked tornado struck the town of Parthenon and heavily damaged several homes, destroyed outbuildings, and ripped the roof off of a church building. The town's post office; which was housed a single-wide trailer structure, was completely swept away and destroyed. Further along the path to the north of Vendor, a house was destroyed. Near Saint Joe, a house sustained significant damage, a manufactured home was completely destroyed, and outbuildings were damaged. Many trees and power lines were downed along the path. One person was injured.
EF1	Wentzville	St. Charles	MO	38.8051°N 90.9085°W	05:51–05:54	3.15 mi (5.07 km)	100 yd (91 m)	A tornado began west of Wentzville and tracked through downtown, causing mainly minor damage to many homes and businesses. However, one building sustained significant damage to its roof while a second large building at a lumber business was destroyed. Many mobile homes were damaged at a mobile home park, one of which was flipped over. Trees were snapped and uprooted, a large camper trailer was overturned, and several road signs were flattened. Three people were injured at the mobile home park.
EF1	N of Easton	Mason	IL	40.2633°N 89.8563°W	05:52–05:57	6.76 mi (10.88 km)	150 yd (140 m)	A machine shed was severely damaged, with most of its roof removed and a northern wall bowed out. A home under construction had part of its eastern wall blown out. Power poles were snapped, irrigation rigs were overturned, a grain silo had half of its peaked roof caved in, and part of a second machine shed had smaller wall pieces ripped off. A farmstead was damaged as well.

=== March 7 event ===
List of confirmed tornadoes – Tuesday, March 7, 2017
EF#	Location	County / Parish	State	Start Coord.	Time (UTC)	Path length	Max width	Summary
EF1	NW of San Jose	Tazewell	IL	40.3459°N 89.6934°W	06:00–06:06	7.38 mi (11.88 km)	150 yd (140 m)	Numerous trees were snapped or uprooted, and numerous outbuildings or barns were severely damaged.
EF2	NNE of Delavan	Tazewell	IL	40.392°N 89.5381°W	06:09–06:13	2.8 mi (4.5 km)	200 yd (180 m)	Several outbuildings and grain bins were heavily damaged or destroyed, a trailer was overturned, and trees were snapped or uprooted. Debris from affected structures was scattered up to a mile away.
EF0	E of Ladd	Bureau	IL	41.382°N 89.205°W	06:14–06:15	0.29 mi (0.47 km)	25 yd (23 m)	A trained storm spotter reported a brief tornado in a field.
EF0	S of Dittmer	Jefferson	MO	38.3116°N 90.7115°W	06:29–06:32	2.63 mi (4.23 km)	80 yd (73 m)	Several trees were snapped, uprooted, and twisted. Several homes sustained minor roof and siding damage.
EF0	Hillsboro	Jefferson	MO	38.2424°N 90.5707°W	06:39–06:41	1.14 mi (1.83 km)	75 yd (69 m)	Bleachers, hurdles, and other school equipment were destroyed and blown up to 300 yd (270 m) at Hillsboro High School. Several buildings, including barns and outbuildings, at the Jefferson County Fairgrounds sustained major roof failure, with debris tossed up to 200 yd (180 m). The roofs to a social services building and a number of homes sustained damage. Trees were toppled.
EF1	Sawyerville to SE of Litchfield	Macoupin, Montgomery	IL	39.0745°N 89.815°W	06:50–07:03	12.92 mi (20.79 km)	100 yd (91 m)	One garage in Sawyerville was destroyed, damaging two cars inside. Homes in town sustained minor damage, an RV camper was rolled, and trees and power poles were downed. Some falling trees landed on homes in Sawyerville. Outside of town, the tornado continued to the northeast and caused additional minor damage to trees, homes, and outbuildings before dissipating. One person was injured.
EF1	E of Irving to E of Witt	Montgomery	IL	39.2061°N 89.3969°W	07:14–07:19	7.17 mi (11.54 km)	100 yd (91 m)	Farm outbuildings had portions of their metal covering ripped off, trees were snapped, and empty grain bins were tossed 100–200 yd (91–183 m). One home had its chimney blown off, and a barn was slid partially off its foundation.
EF0	N of Black Rock	Lawrence	AR	36.1184°N 91.1020°W	08:37–08:38	0.35 mi (0.56 km)	100 yd (91 m)	Some farm buildings sustained damage to their metal roofs. Trees were damaged as well.

== Non-tornadic effects ==
Hail reached up to 4 inches (10 cm) in Cokato, Minnesota. Straight line winds in Olathe, Kansas forced the closure of Johnson County Executive Airport. Wind gusts reached 90 miles per hour (140 km/h) in Belle Plaine, Iowa. Additionally, warm air surged into the area before the storms, and condensation forced the Minnesota Timberwolves to postpone a basketball game; temperatures that day reached 65 °F (18 °C), melting an ice sheet under the court.

== See also ==
- Tornadoes of 2017
- Tornado outbreak of February 28 – March 1, 2017 – A tornado outbreak that affected portions of the same area a week prior
