= Cyclone Donna =

Category 5 South Pacific cyclone in 2017

Severe Tropical Cyclone Donna
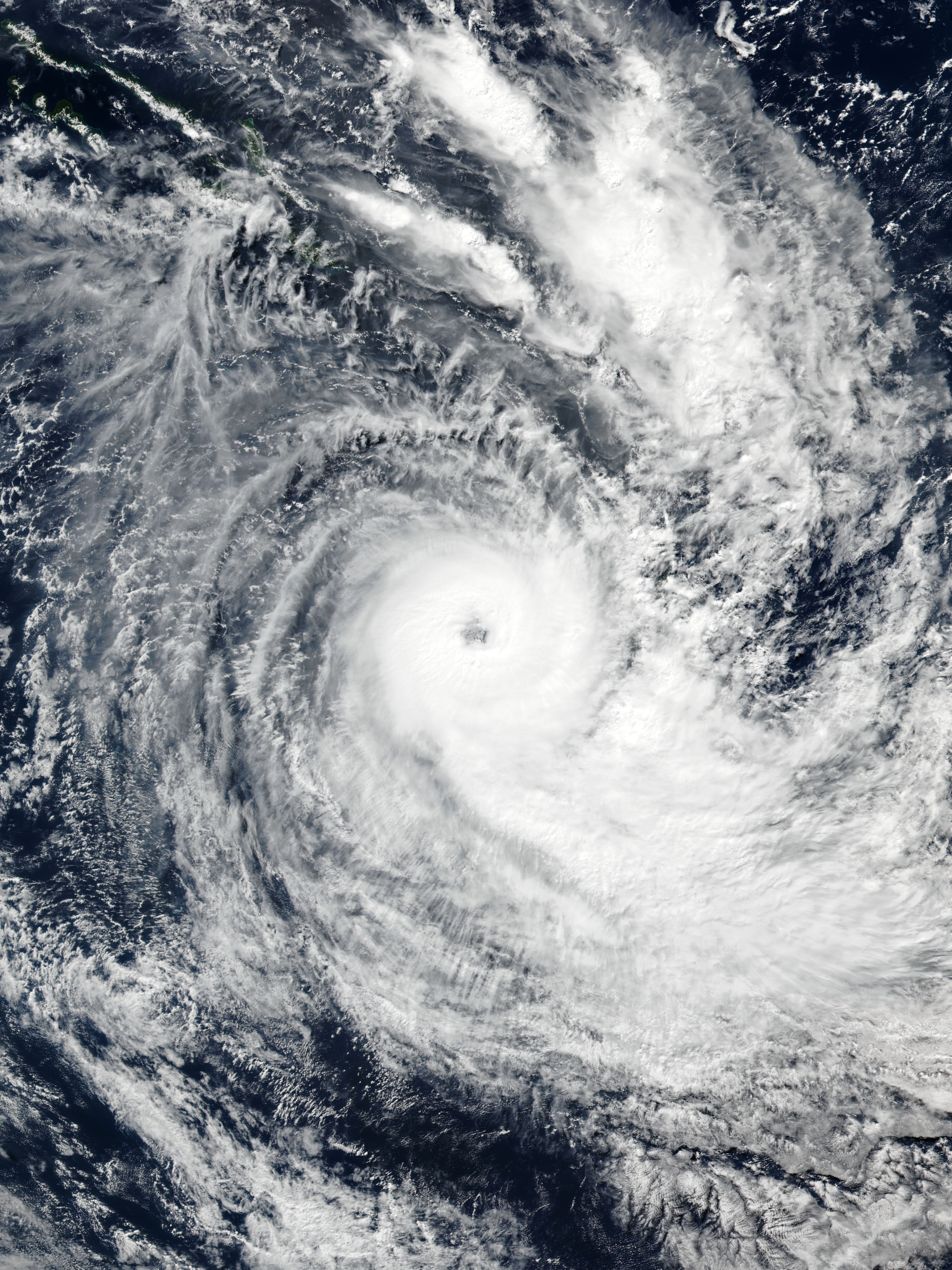
- Cyclone Donna north of New Caledonia at peak intensity on 8 May

Meteorological history
- Formed: 1 May 2017
- Extratropical: 10 May 2017
- Dissipated: 16 May 2017

Category 5 severe tropical cyclone
- 10-minute sustained (FMS)
- Highest winds: 205 km/h (125 mph)
- Lowest pressure: 935 hPa (mbar); 27.61 inHg

Category 4-equivalent tropical cyclone
- 1-minute sustained (SSHWS/JTWC)
- Highest winds: 230 km/h (145 mph)
- Lowest pressure: 929 hPa (mbar); 27.43 inHg

Overall effects
- Fatalities: 2 total
- Damage: $10 million (2017 USD)
- Areas affected: Solomon Islands, Vanuatu, New Caledonia, New Zealand
- IBTrACS
- Part of the 2016–17 South Pacific cyclone season

Severe Tropical Cyclone Donna was the strongest off-season tropical cyclone in the Southern Hemisphere at the time, since surpassed by Cyclone Lola in 2023. The twenty-first tropical disturbance, third named storm, and second severe tropical cyclone of the annual cyclone season, Donna formed from an area of disturbed weather that was first monitored west-northwest of Fiji on 1 May 2017. The disturbance drifted eastward amid an increasingly favourable environment, and it was designated Tropical Depression 21F late on 2 May. Twelve hours later, it intensified into a Category 1 on the Australian tropical cyclone scale and was designated Tropical Cyclone Donna as the storm's motion shifted west and then south. After reaching its initial peak as a Category 4 cyclone early on 6 May, the effects of wind shear and upwelling caused the storm to weaken. However, it reintensified into a Category 5 cyclone on 8 May. Soon after, Donna entered a region of strong westerly flow and began to rapidly weaken. Continuing to accelerate in a southerly direction, Donna eventually weakened into a tropical low on 10 May. By 16 May, Donna's remnants had fully dissipated.

Buffeting the island chain of Vanuatu, Donna has resulted in severe damage throughout the northern provinces, though the exact extent is unknown in the absence of good communication.

== Meteorological history ==
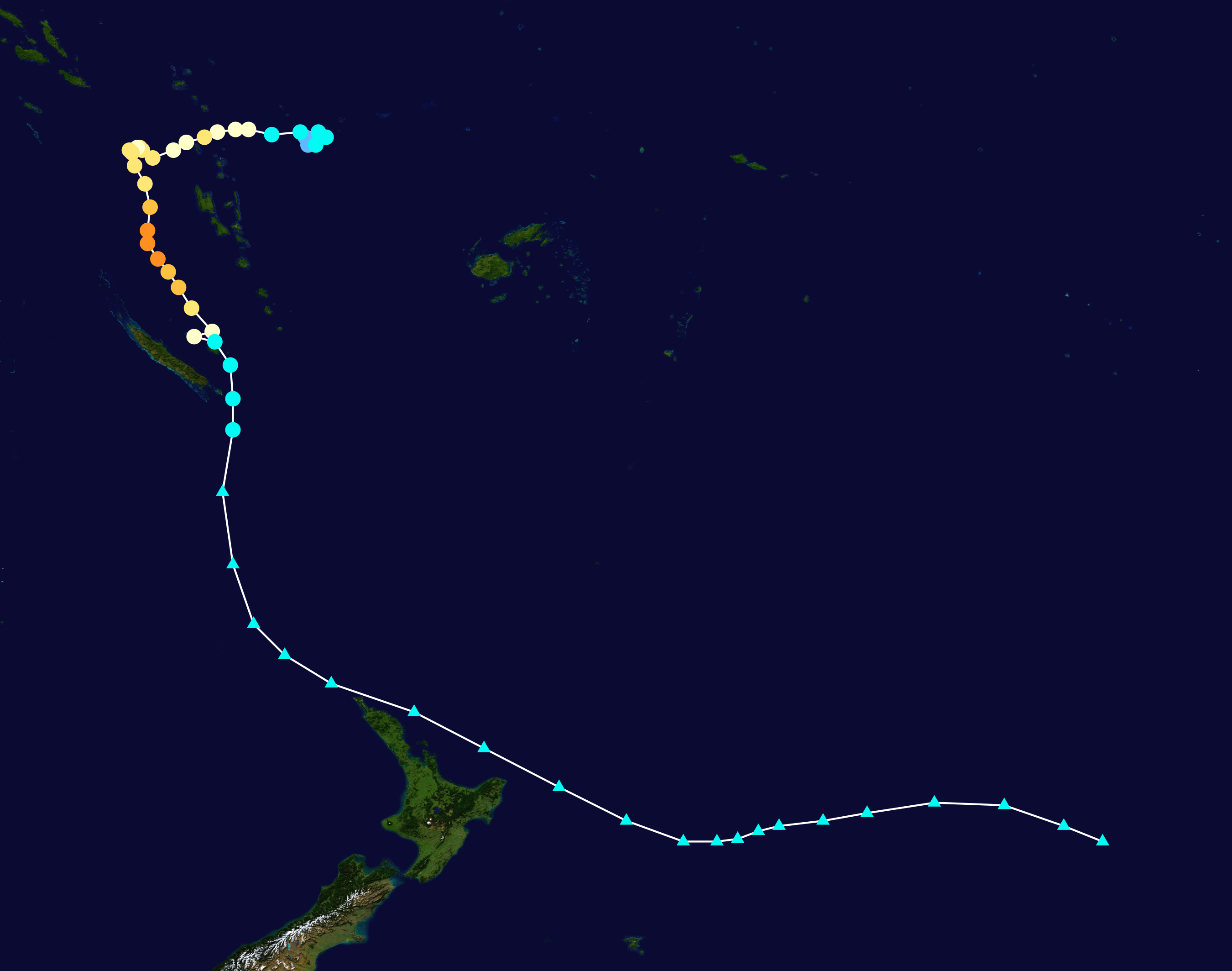
Map plotting the storm's track and intensity, according to the Saffir–Simpson scale Map key Saffir–Simpson scale Tropical depression (≤38 mph, ≤62 km/h) Tropical storm (39–73 mph, 63–118 km/h) Category 1 (74–95 mph, 119–153 km/h) Category 2 (96–110 mph, 154–177 km/h) Category 3 (111–129 mph, 178–208 km/h) Category 4 (130–156 mph, 209–251 km/h) Category 5 (≥157 mph, ≥252 km/h) Unknown Storm type Tropical cyclone Subtropical cyclone Extratropical cyclone, remnant low, tropical disturbance, or monsoon depression

On 1 May, the day after the official end of the South Pacific cyclone season, the Joint Typhoon Warning Center (JTWC) began monitoring an area of disturbed weather about 1,455 km (905 mi) west-northwest of Nadi. Though it possessed an oblong area of low pressure partially exposed to the northeast of deep shower and thunderstorm activity, the system was embedded within an environment of moderate wind shear, good upper-level outflow, and warm ocean temperatures. The official warning agency for the South Pacific, the Fiji Meteorological Service (FMS), began monitoring the disturbance a short while later. As fragmented spiral bands began wrapping into the centre of circulation, the JTWC assessed that the potential for tropical cyclone formation was high, issuing a Tropical Cyclone Formation Alert accordingly at 21:00 UTC on 1 May. The storm tracked slowly eastward through the northern islands of Vanuatu but consolidated rapidly as upper-level winds became light, prompting the FMS to upgrade the disturbance to Tropical Depression 21F at 18:00 UTC on 2 May. This was followed by the JTWC's classification of Tropical Cyclone 18P three hours later.

Following formation, the depression turned west in response to a developing subtropical ridge to its south. A continued favourable environment allowed it to intensify into a Category 1 on the Australian tropical cyclone scale by 06:00 UTC on 3 May, at which point it was named "Donna" by the FMS, and further to Category 2 intensity by 18:00 UTC. The JTWC, meanwhile, upped the cyclone to the equivalent of a Category 1 hurricane on the Saffir–Simpson scale, citing consolidation of deep convection near the centre and satellite intensity estimates around 120 km/h (75 mph). Despite some evidence of wind shear along the northern fringes of the storm, it began to clear an eye late on 4 May, prompting the JTWC to classify Donna as a Category 2 equivalent, and the FMS to upgrade to Category 3 strength. At 00:00 UTC on 6 May, after re-tracking through Vanuatu and beginning a southward track, Donna attained its initial peak as a Category 4 cyclone.

Shortly thereafter, the effects of increased northeasterly upper-level flow became more prevalent as the storm's cloud pattern changed to a central cold cover and then devolved into patchy areas of moderate convection. Around 09:00 UTC on 6 May, the JTWC reduced the storm back to a Category 1 equivalent, and by 18:00 UTC, the FMS indicated Donna had weakened to a Category 3 cyclone on the Australian scale.

Drifting south-southwest and then south, Donna continued to struggle under the combined effects of upper-level winds and ocean upwelling. By early on 7 May, however, convection within the eyewall began to increase in intensity, and the FMS upgraded Donna to a Category 4 cyclone for a second time accordingly. Three hours later, the JTWC estimated that it had intensified to a Category 4 equivalent, completely skipping Category 3 status. With a solid ring of deep convection surrounding a well-defined 55 km (35 mi) eye, the FMS upgraded Donna to a Category 5 cyclone at 00:00 UTC on 8 May, estimating that the storm possessed 10-minute sustained winds of 205 km/h (125 mph). As a result, Donna became the strongest off-season tropical cyclone on record during the month of May in the South Pacific basin. Weakening began shortly following peak intensity as Donna's eye became partially obscured and the eastern eyewall was eroded; the storm weakened back to Category 4 intensity by 18:00 UTC on 8 May, Category 1 intensity by 21:00 UTC on 9 May, and ultimately degenerated into a tropical low by 06:00 UTC on 10 May as it dodged New Caledonia.

== Preparations and impact ==
According to Aon Benfield Inc. in January 2018, Donna was responsible for two deaths and a total of US$10 million in damage.

=== Vanuatu ===
As Donna buffeted Vanuatu, entire villages across the Torres Islands of Torba Province were forced to seek refuge in caves. Throughout the province, buildings were destroyed and others had their roofs ripped off. Heavy rainfall led to flooding of low-lying areas of Efate. In Port Vila, rushing water carved out large chunks of land that resulted in structural collapse. Across the entire northern half of the island chain, crops sustained significant damage and water sources were contaminated, though the full extent of the damage was unknown as a result of severed communications.

=== Solomon Islands ===
In the Temotu Province, Donna caused two fatalities; an adult who was struck by a fallen branch and a primary school student of Tarano School who drowned on an out-board motorboat when crossing from one-side to the other side of a lake.

=== New Zealand ===
Moisture from the remnants of Donna combined with a weakening Tasman Sea low to produce heavy rains over much of the North Island and the west coast of the South Island. In expectation of more than 100 mm (3.9 in) of rain, heavy rain warnings were issued for Nelson and the Bay of Plenty regions, while severe weather warnings were issued for much of the North Island.

== See also ==
- Weather of 2016 and 2017
- Tropical cyclones in 2016 and 2017
- List of off-season South Pacific tropical cyclones
- Cyclone Namu – another South Pacific severe tropical cyclone that occurred in May 1986
- Cyclone Gina – a severe tropical cyclone which developed in June 2003
- Cyclone Pam – made landfall in Vanuatu in March 2015
