= 2016–17 South Pacific cyclone season =

Tropical cyclone season

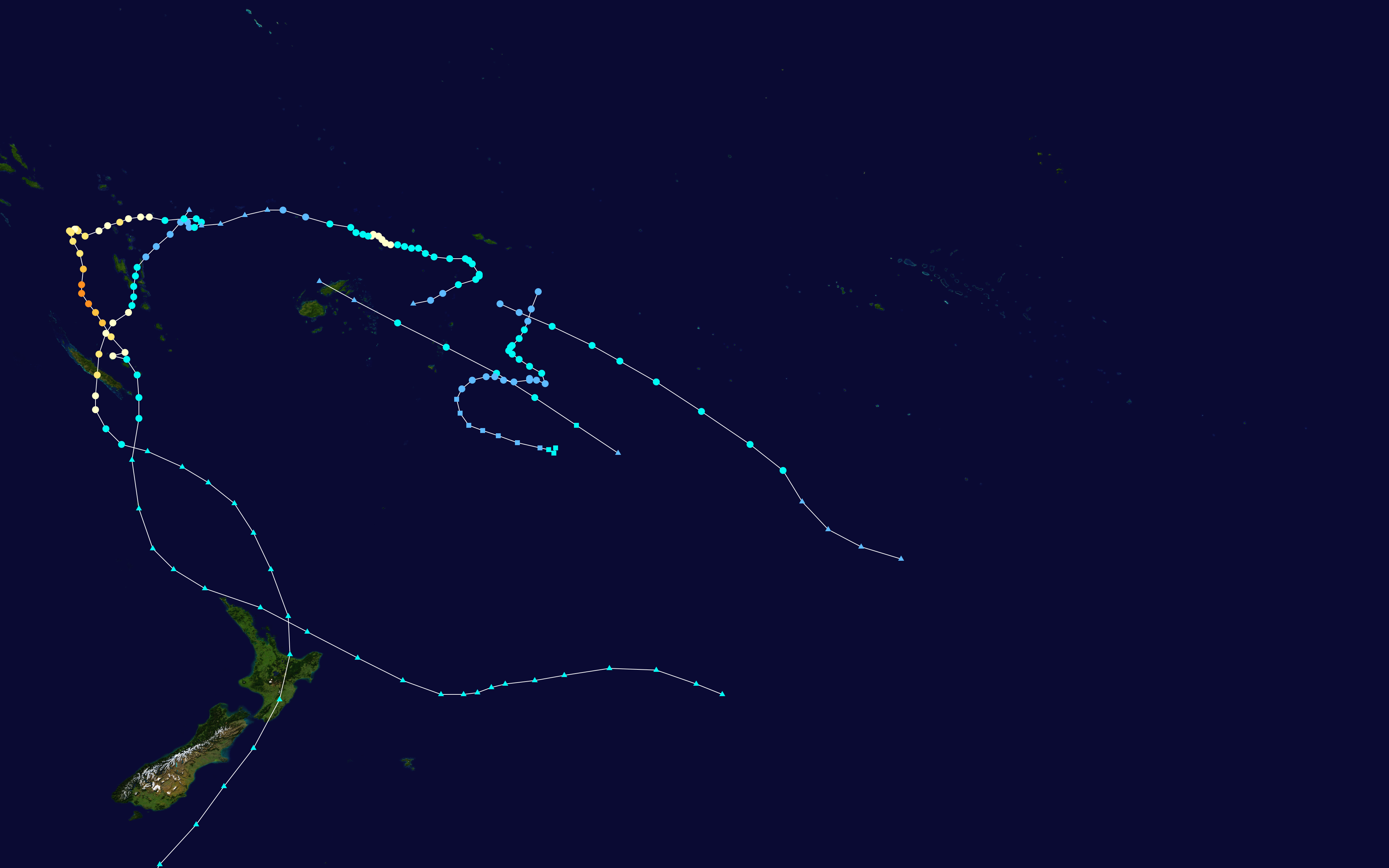
- Season summary map

Seasonal boundaries
- First system formed: November 12, 2016
- Last system dissipated: May 14, 2017

Strongest storm
- Name: Donna
  - Maximum winds: 205 km/h (125 mph) (10-minute sustained)
  - Lowest pressure: 935 hPa (mbar)

Seasonal statistics
- Total disturbances: 22
- Total depressions: 12
- Tropical cyclones: 4
- Severe tropical cyclones: 2
- Total fatalities: 3 total
- Total damage: $47.7 million (2016 USD)

Related articles
- 2016–17 Australian region cyclone season; 2016–17 South-West Indian Ocean cyclone season

The 2016–17 South Pacific cyclone season was the least active South Pacific cyclone season since the 2011–12 season, with only four tropical cyclones occurring within the South Pacific Ocean to the east of 160°E. Two of the four systems developed into severe tropical cyclones on the Australian tropical cyclone intensity scale. The season officially ran from November 1, 2016 until April 30, 2017. However, May featured two post-season systems: Donna and Ella, of which the former was the strongest post-season South Pacific tropical cyclone ever recorded in that month. Overall, 22 tropical disturbances were monitored by a combination of the Fiji Meteorological Service (FMS), Australian Bureau of Meteorology (BoM) and New Zealand's MetService.

Official advisories regarding tropical cyclones in this basin were issued by the FMS through the Regional Specialized Meteorological Center (RSMC) in Nadi, the BoM through the Tropical Cyclone Warning Center (TCWC) in Brisbane and MetService through the TCWC in Wellington. The United States Armed Forces through the Joint Typhoon Warning Center (JTWC) also monitored the basin and issued unofficial warnings for American interests. RSMC Nadi attached a number and an F suffix to tropical disturbances that formed in or moved into the basin while the JTWC designated significant tropical cyclones with a number and a P suffix. RSMC Nadi, TCWC Wellington and TCWC Brisbane all used the Australian Tropical Cyclone Intensity Scale and estimated sustained windspeeds over a period of ten minutes, while the JTWC estimated sustained windspeeds over a 1-minute period, which were subsequently compared to the Saffir–Simpson scale (SSHWS).

== Seasonal forecasts ==
Source/Record	Tropical Cyclone	Severe Tropical Cyclone	Ref
Record high:	1997–98: 16	1982–83:10	
Record low:	2011–12: 3	2008–09: 0	
Average (1969–70 – 2015–16):	7.3	—	
NIWA October	8–10	>5	
Fiji Meteorological Service	5–7	3–5	
NIWA February	6	2	
Region	Chance of above average	Average number	Actual activity
Western South Pacific	65%	7	1
Eastern South Pacific	52%	10	4
Source:BOM's South Pacific Tropical Cyclone Season Outlook.

Ahead of the cyclone season, the Fiji Meteorological Service (FMS), Australian Bureau of Meteorology (BoM), New Zealand's MetService and National Institute of Water and Atmospheric Research (NIWA) and various other Pacific Meteorological services, all contributed towards the Island Climate Update tropical cyclone outlook that was released during October 2016. The outlook took into account the ENSO neutral conditions that had been observed across the Pacific and analogue seasons that had ENSO neutral and weak La Niña conditions occurring during the season. The outlook called for a near average number of tropical cyclones for the 2016–17 season, with eight to ten named tropical cyclones, to occur between 135°E and 120°W compared to an average of 10.4. At least five of the tropical cyclones were expected to become Category 3 severe tropical cyclones, while four could become Category 4 severe tropical cyclones; they also noted that a Category 5 severe tropical cyclone was unlikely to occur. In addition to contributing towards the Island Climate Update outlook, the FMS and the BoM issued their own seasonal forecasts for the South Pacific region.

The BoM issued two seasonal forecasts for the Southern Pacific Ocean, for their self-defined eastern and western regions of the South Pacific Ocean. They predicted that the Western region between 142.5°E and 165°E, had a 65% chance of seeing activity above its average of 7 tropical cyclones. The BoM also predicted that the Eastern Region between 165°E and 120°W, had a 52% chance of seeing activity above its average of 10 tropical cyclones. Within their outlook the FMS predicted that between five and six tropical cyclones, would occur within the basin compared to an average of around 7.3 cyclones. At least three of the tropical cyclones were expected to become Category 3 severe tropical cyclones, while one or two were predicted to peak as a Category 4 or 5 severe tropical cyclone. They also reported that the tropical cyclone genesis trough was expected to be located, within the Coral Sea to the west of the International Date Line. This was based on the expected and predicted ENSO conditions, and the existence of the Pacific warm pool of sub-surface temperature anomalies in this region.

Both the Island Climate Update and the FMS tropical cyclone outlooks assessed the risk of a tropical cyclone affecting a certain island or territory. As the tropical cyclone genesis trough of low pressure was expected to be located to the west of the International Date Line, normal or slightly above normal activity was expected for areas near the dateline. The Island Climate Update Outlook predicted that Fiji, New Zealand, Samoa, Tokelau, Tuvalu, Vanuatu, Wallis and Futuna, the Solomon and Cook Islands had a normal risk of being impacted by a tropical cyclone or ex tropical cyclone. They also predicted that Tonga, Papua New Guinea and Niue had an elevated chance of being impacted, while it was thought unlikely that French Polynesia, Kiribati and the Pitcairn Islands would be affected by a tropical cyclone. The FMS's outlook predicted that Fiji and Tonga had an elevated risk, while Tuvalu, French Polynesia and Kiribati, were thought to have a low to reduced chance of being affected by a tropical cyclone. The outlook also predicted that New Caledonia, Niue, Samoa, Solomon Islands, Tokelau, Vanuatu, Wallis & Futuna were thought to have a normal chance of being affected by a tropical cyclone. It was thought that there was an elevated risk of the Solomon Islands being impacted by at least one severe tropical cyclone, while other areas such as Fiji, New Caledonia, Niue, Samoa, French Polynesia and Tuvalu, had a normal to reduced chance of being impacted by a severe tropical cyclone.

An updated tropical cyclone outlook was issued by the Island Climate Update during February 2017, as the predicted La Niña conditions had not materialised and the season had produced no tropical cyclones. The outlook reported that around six tropical cyclones were now expected to occur, within the South Pacific between February and the end of the season in April. As a result, the season overall was now expected to below average, however, many islands were still expected to have a near normal risk of a tropical cyclone impacting them.

== Seasonal summary ==
After a near average but destructive tropical cyclone season during the previous year, the first tropical disturbance of the season developed to the north-northeast of Niue during November 12. However, over the next few months, no named tropical cyclones developed. This was attributed to a number of factors, including a poorly organised South Pacific convergence zone and a predicted La Niña episode not developing. Four months after the beginning of the season, the first named storm, Bart, developed on February 21, making it one of the latest forming named tropical cyclones within the basin. No more cyclones were named for nearly two months after this, until the system that became Severe Tropical Cyclone Cook formed. The most active period of the season in terms of cyclone formation actually occurred outside the official bounds of the season, with both Severe Tropical Cyclone Donna and Tropical Cyclone Ella being named in May.

== Systems ==
=== Tropical Depression 04F ===
- Tropical depression (Australian scale)
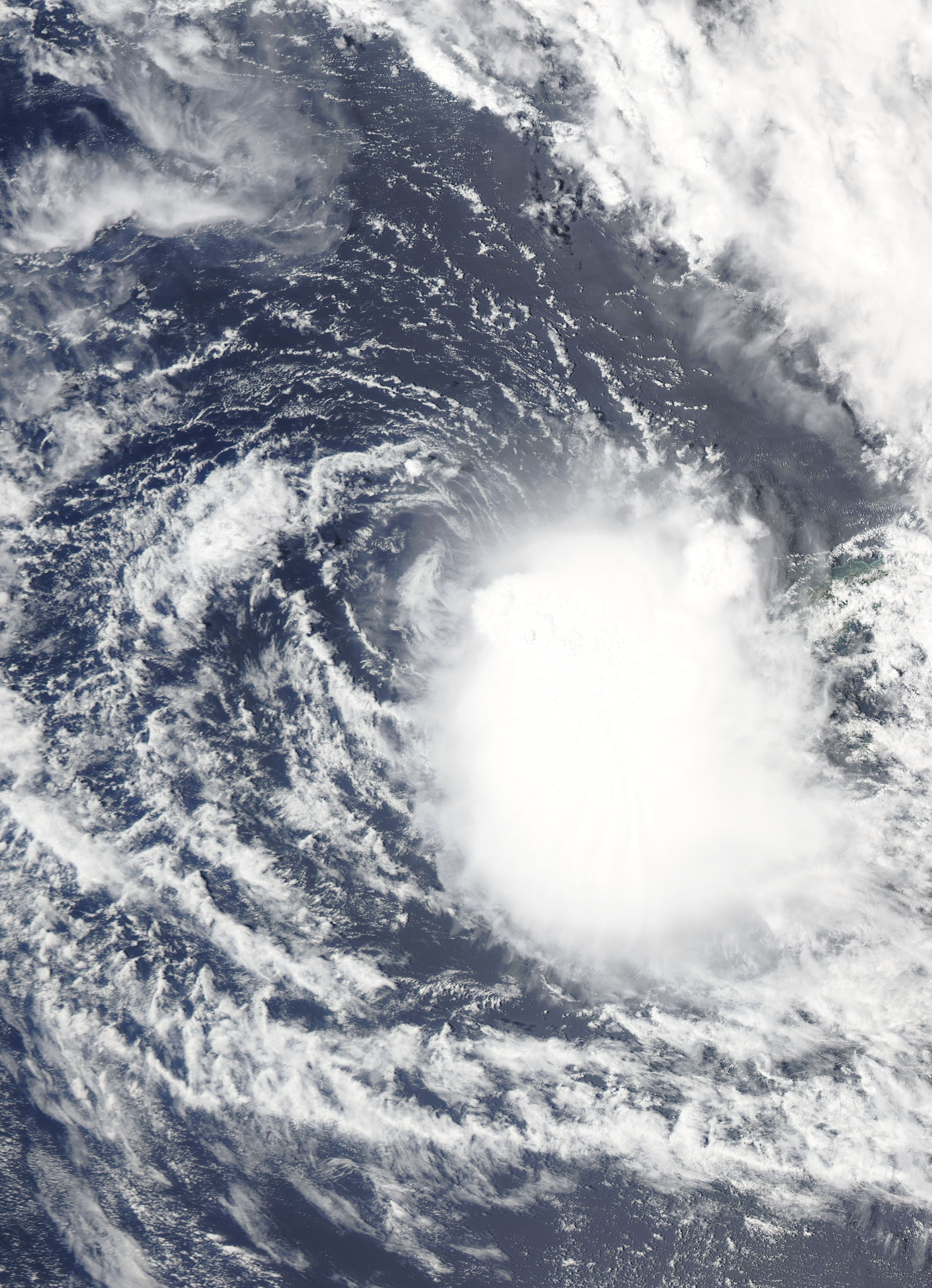
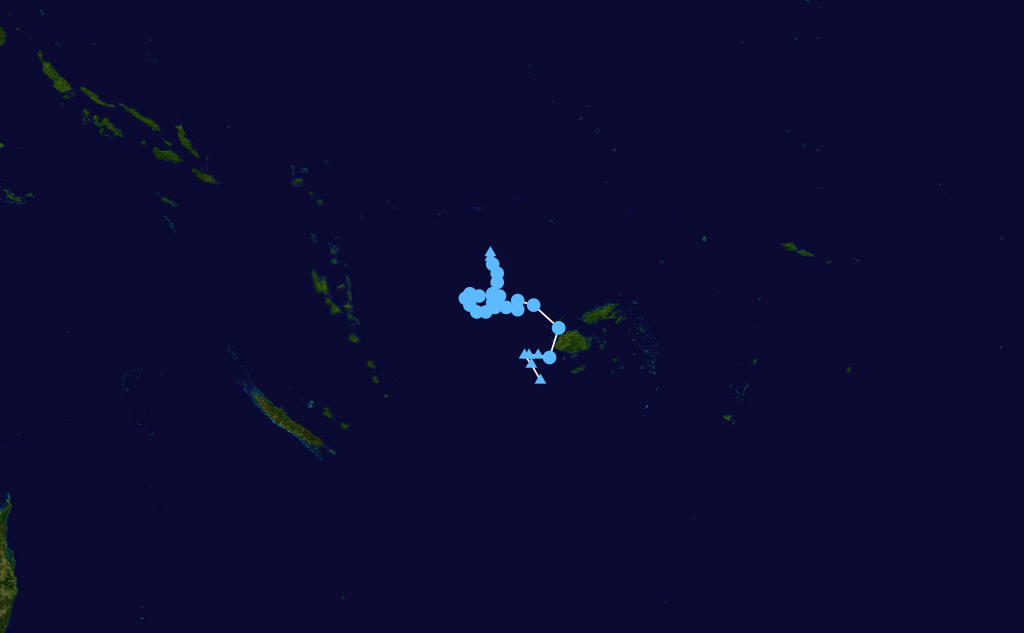
- Duration: December 12 – December 21
- Peak intensity: 45 km/h (30 mph) (10-min); 998 hPa (mbar)

During December 12, the FMS reported that Tropical Disturbance 04F had developed about 105 km (65 mi) to the northeast of Rotuma, Fiji.

=== Tropical Depression 05F ===
- Tropical depression (Australian scale)
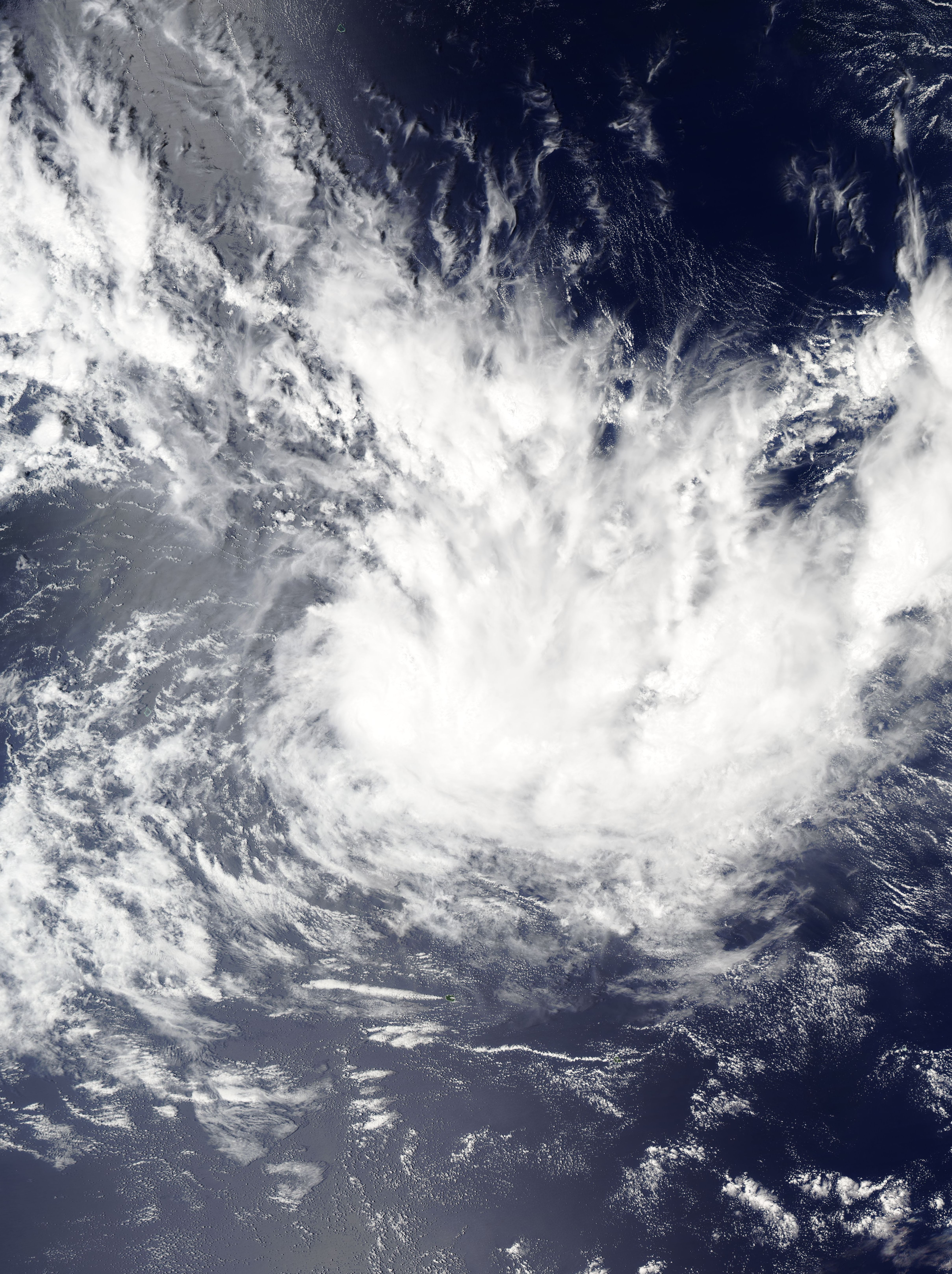
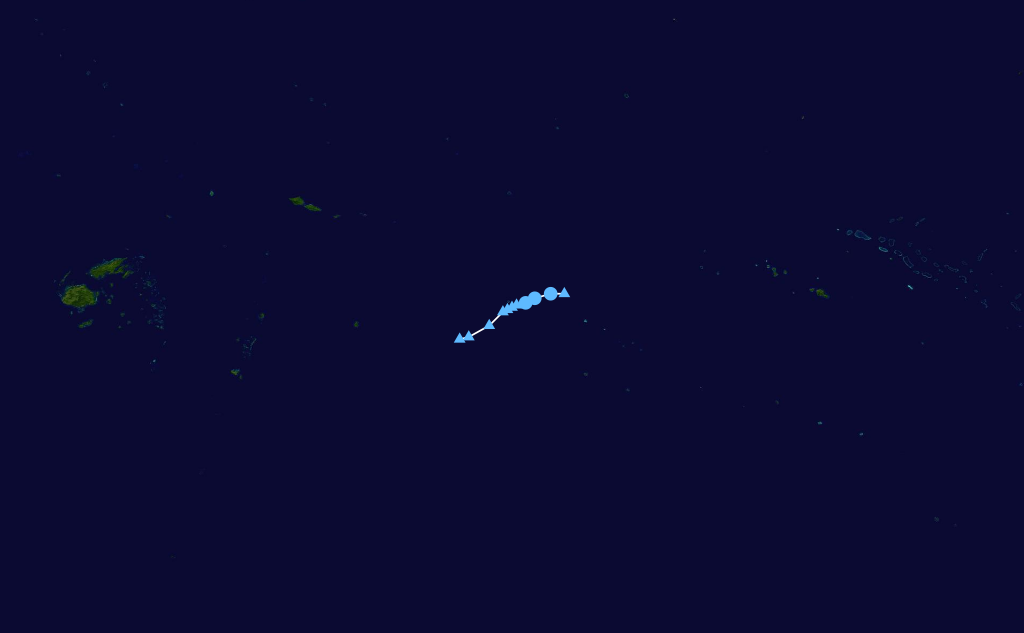
- Duration: December 21 – December 26
- Peak intensity: Winds not specified; 1005 hPa (mbar)

A tropical disturbance formed east of the island of Fiji. It had developed into a tropical depression during December 22. It moved westwards and dissipated December 26.

=== Tropical Depression 09F ===
- Tropical depression (Australian scale)
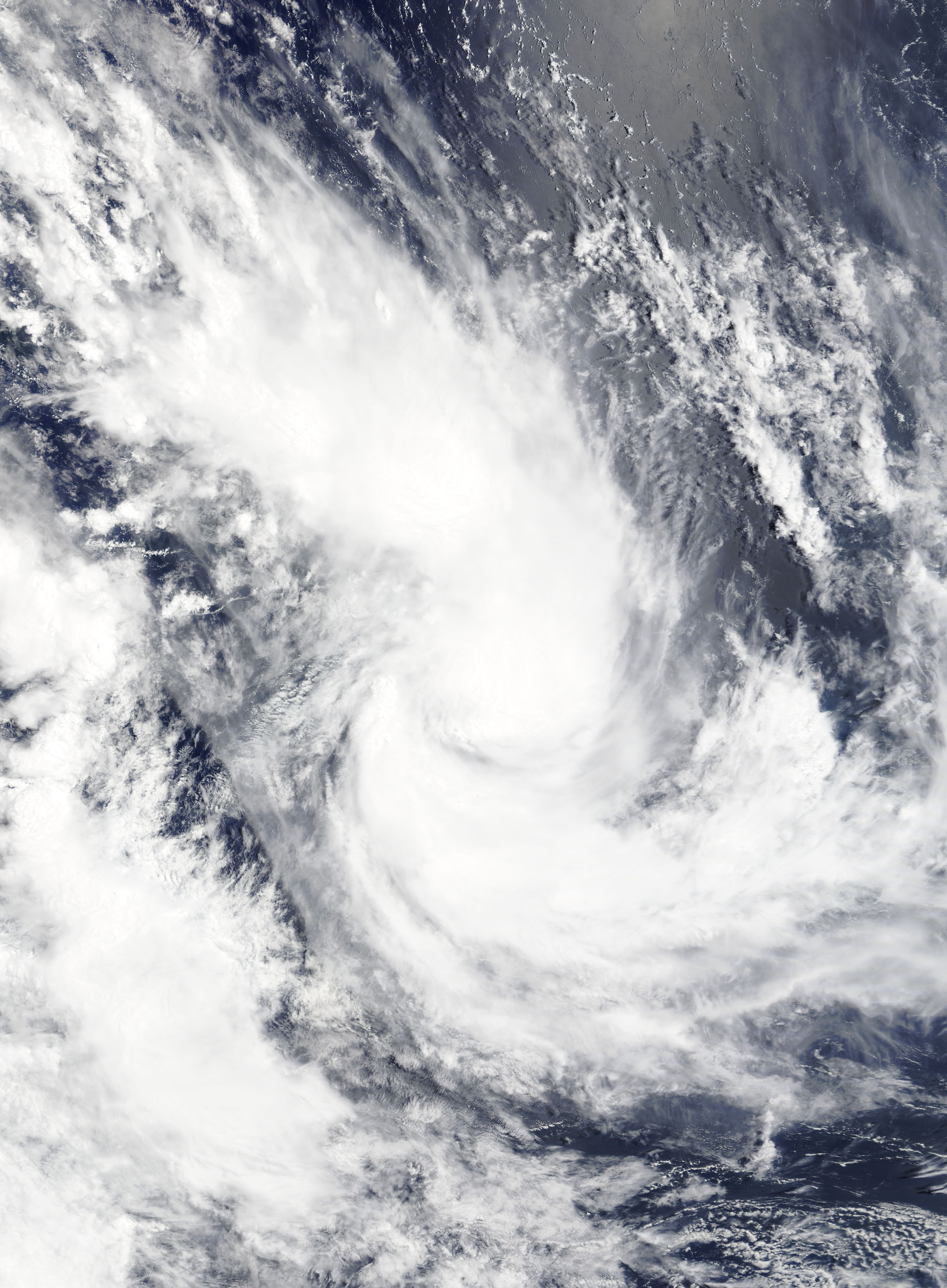
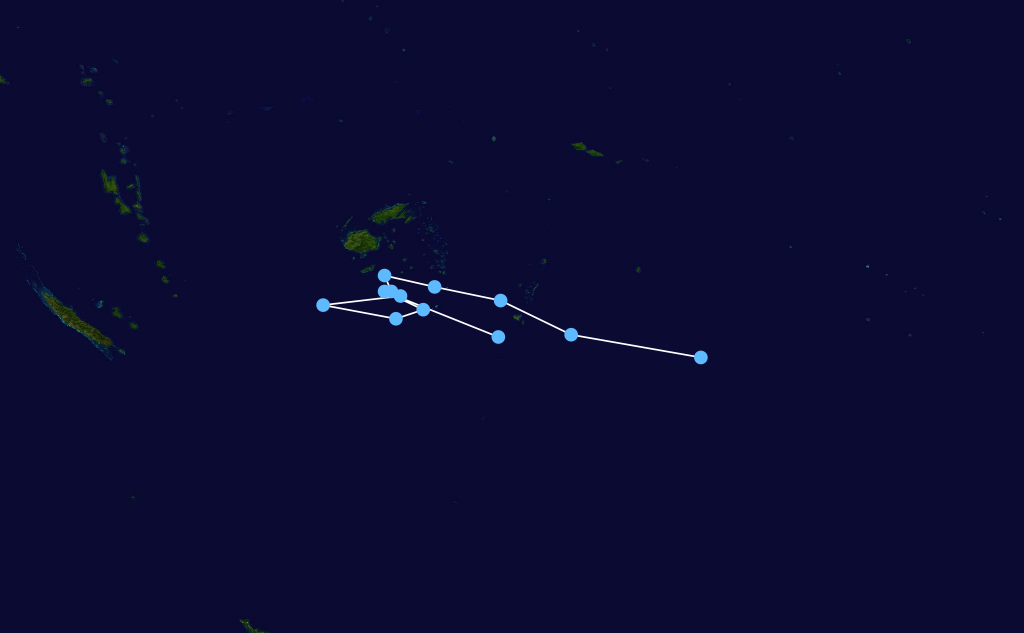
- Duration: February 4 – February 11
- Peak intensity: Winds not specified; 999 hPa (mbar)

During February 5, the FMS reported that Tropical Disturbance 09F had developed within a trough of low pressure, about 210 km (130 mi) to the south-southwest of the Fiji's capital city: Suva. During that day the system moved south-eastwards away from Fiji, before it moved back towards the island nation and passed over the southern Fijian islands between February 6–9.

=== Tropical Depression 10F ===
- Tropical depression (Australian scale)
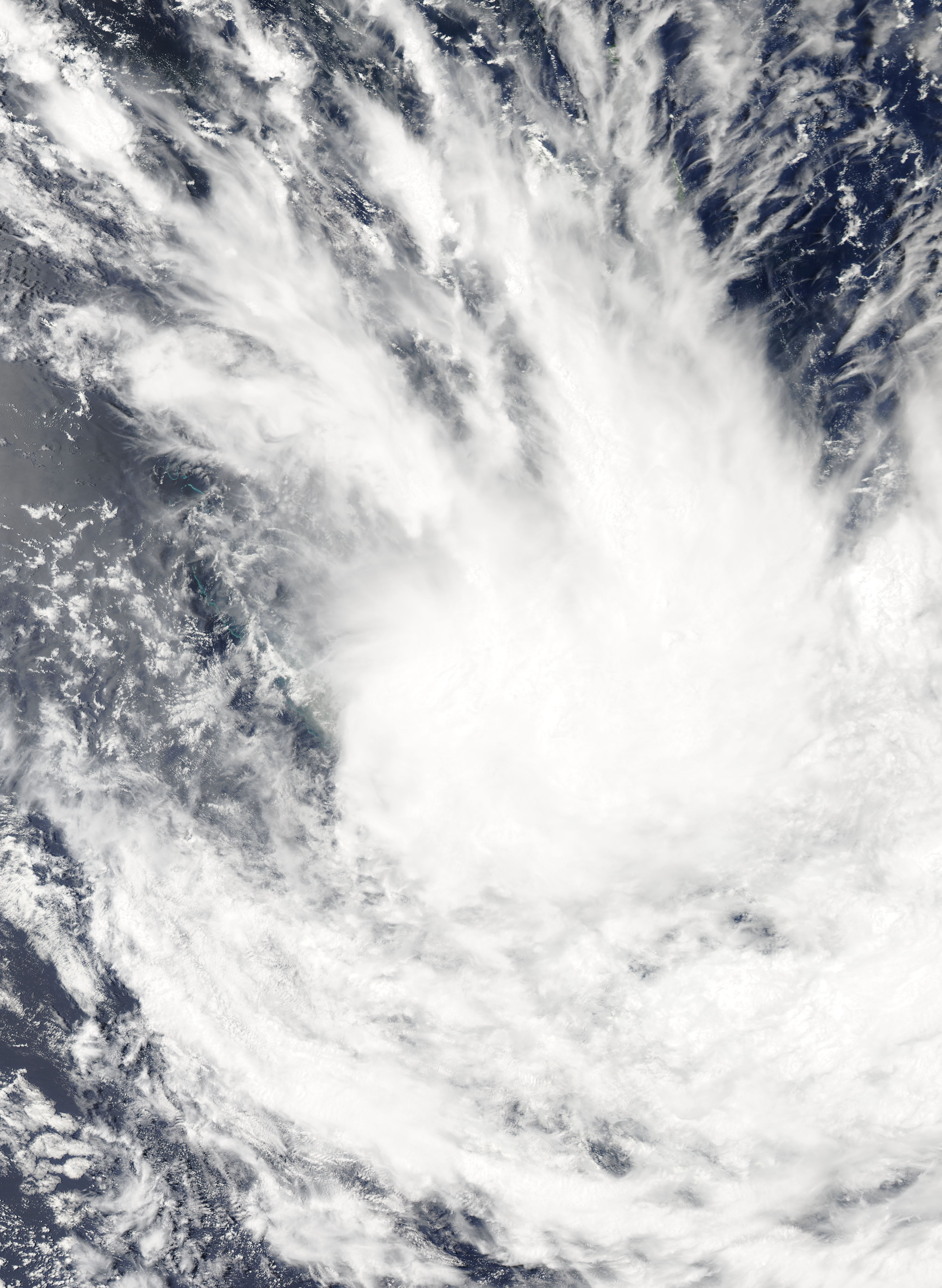
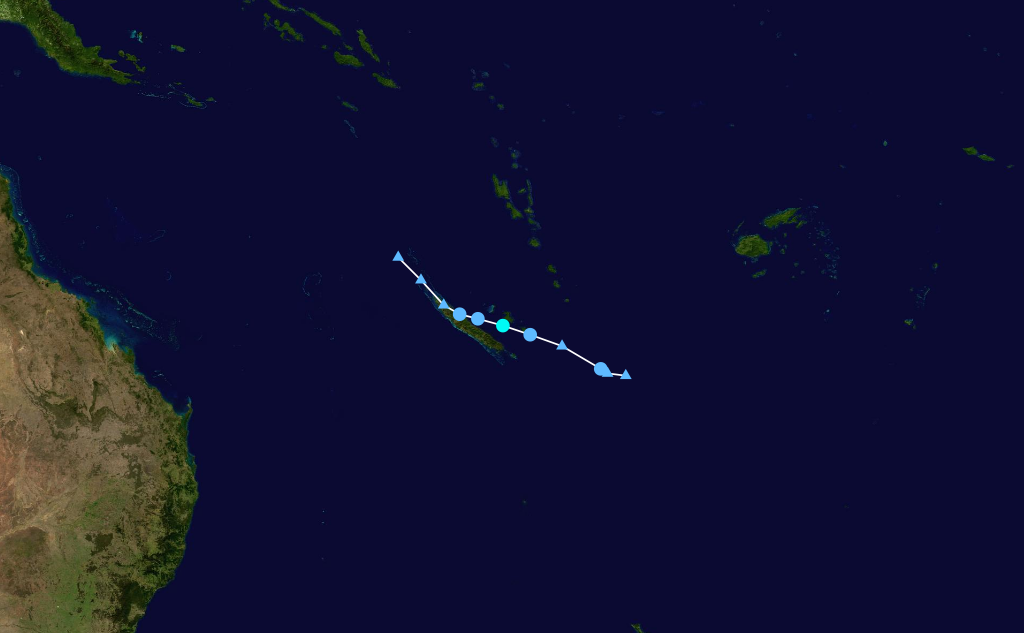
- Duration: February 7 – February 11
- Peak intensity: Winds not specified; 993 hPa (mbar)

A tropical depression developed east of Vanuatu on February 7. It strengthened and reached peak intensity over the early hours of February 8. At the time, the depression made landfall on the islands over the territory of New Caledonia. It rapidly weakened until it degenerated to a remnant low on the late hours of December 9. The FMS will continue monitor it until the early hours of February 11, when it completely succumbed with the remnants of Tropical Depression 11F.

=== Tropical Depression 11F ===
- Tropical depression (Australian scale)
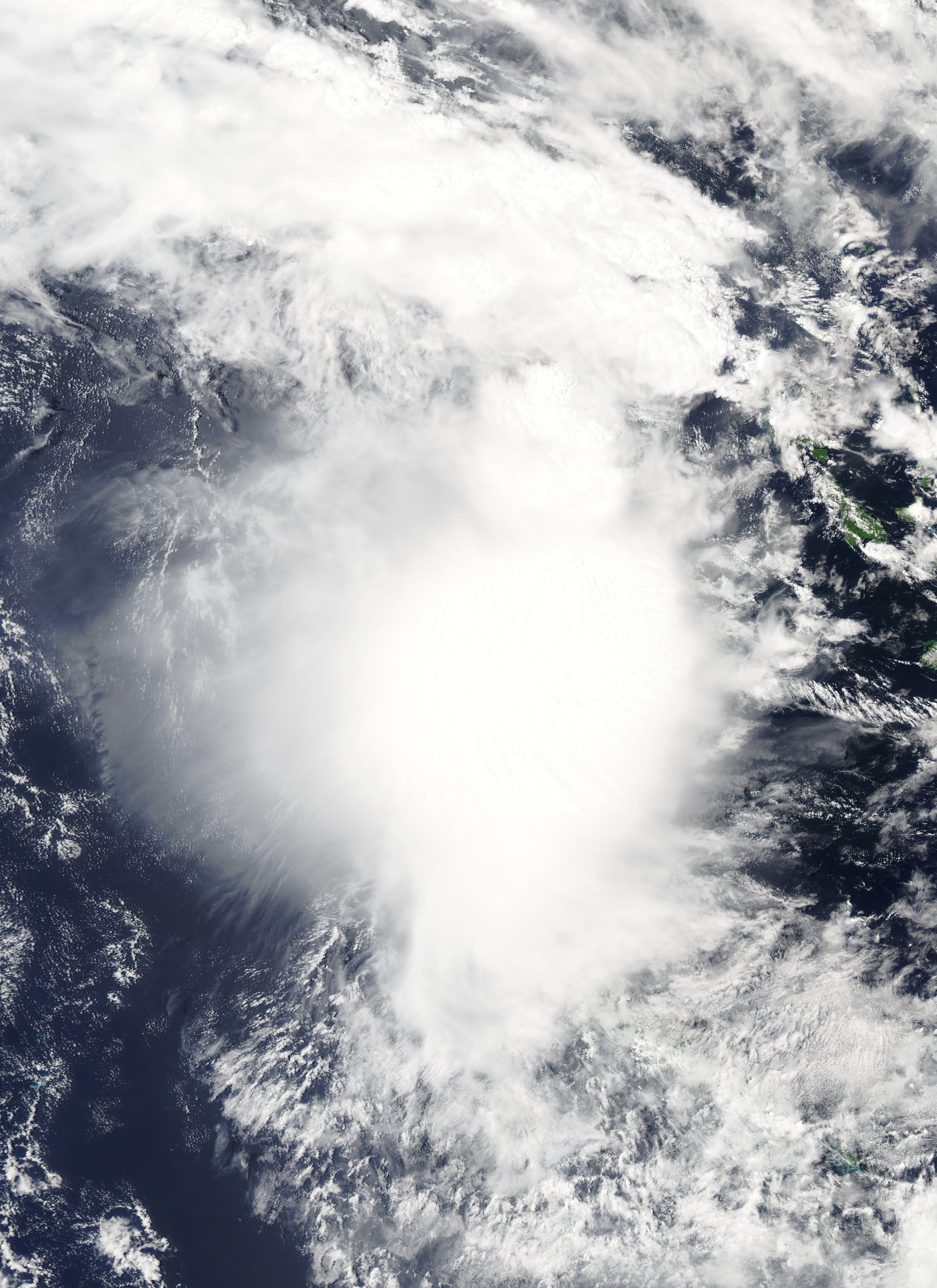
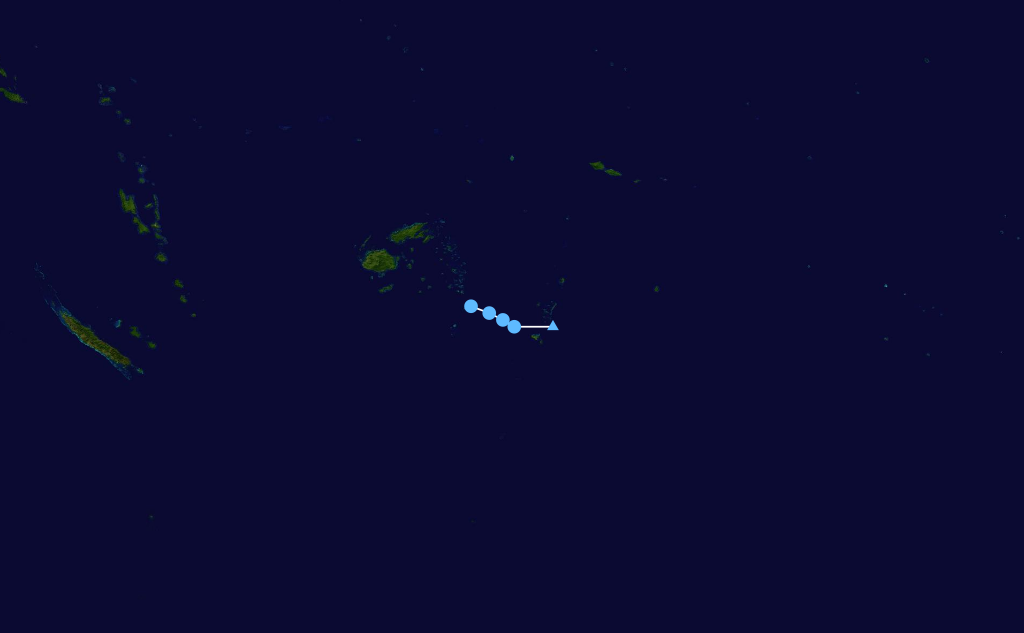
- Duration: February 9 – February 12
- Peak intensity: Winds not specified; 1002 hPa (mbar)

A tropical depression developed over the Coral Sea on February 9. It rapidly intensified until it had peak intensity on the early hours of February 10. It rapidly weakened and FMS discontinued advisories on the system on the early hours of February 11, and the system moved slowly southwest until it dissipated on February 12.

=== Tropical Depression 13F ===
- Tropical depression (Australian scale)
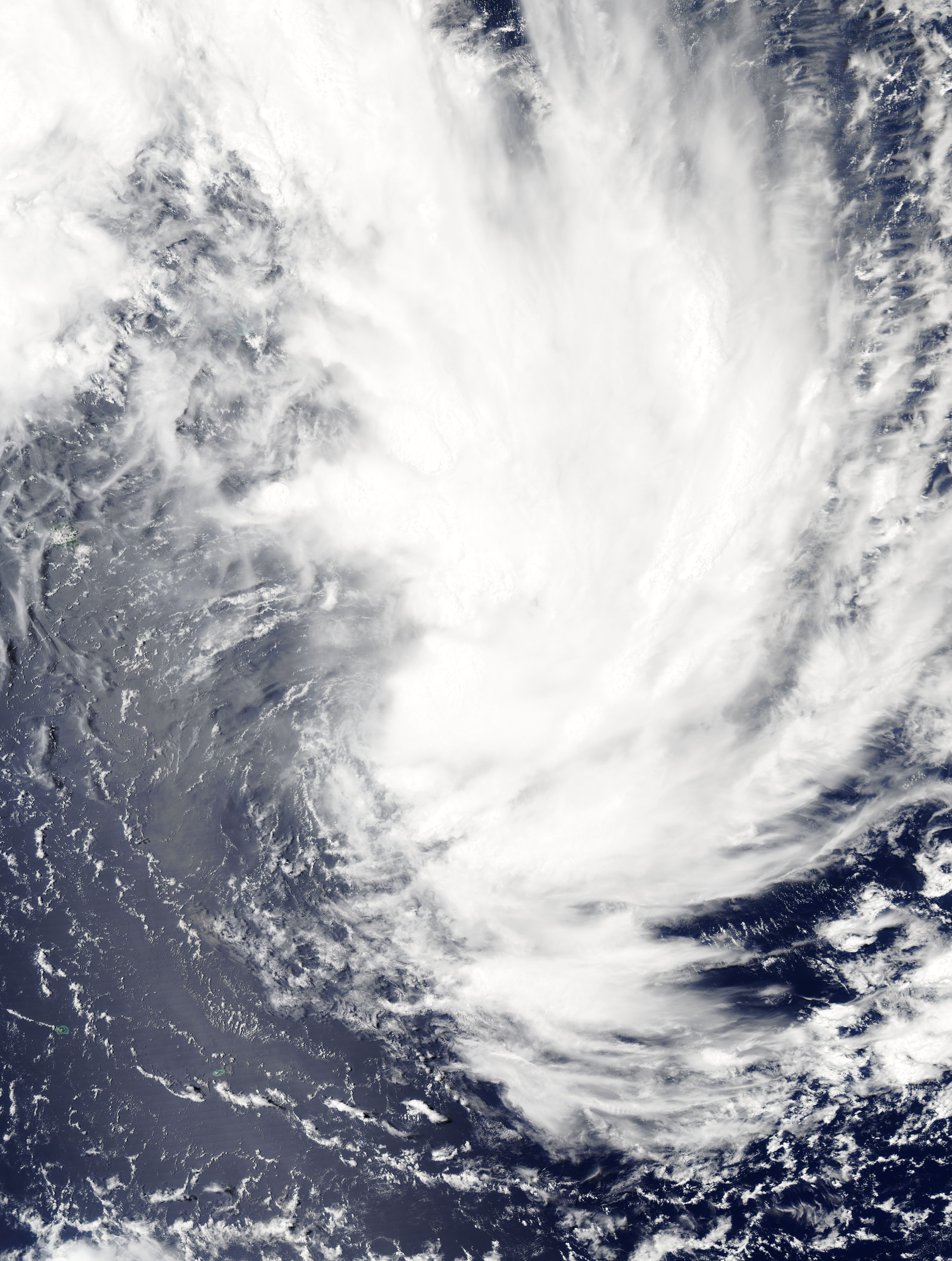
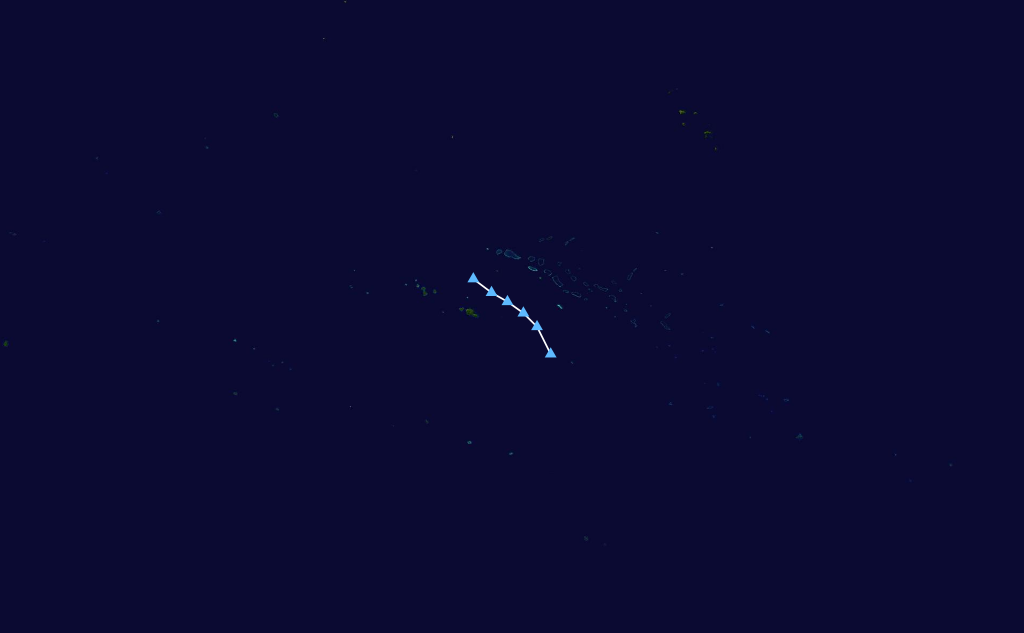
- Duration: February 15 – February 18
- Peak intensity: Winds not specified; 998 hPa (mbar)

A tropical depression developed over French Polynesia on February 15. It intensified until it reached peak intensity over the south Pacific on February 16. It later underwent extratropical transition, a process that would be completed in the late hours of February 18.

=== Tropical Depression 14F ===
- Tropical depression (Australian scale)
- Tropical storm (SSHWS)
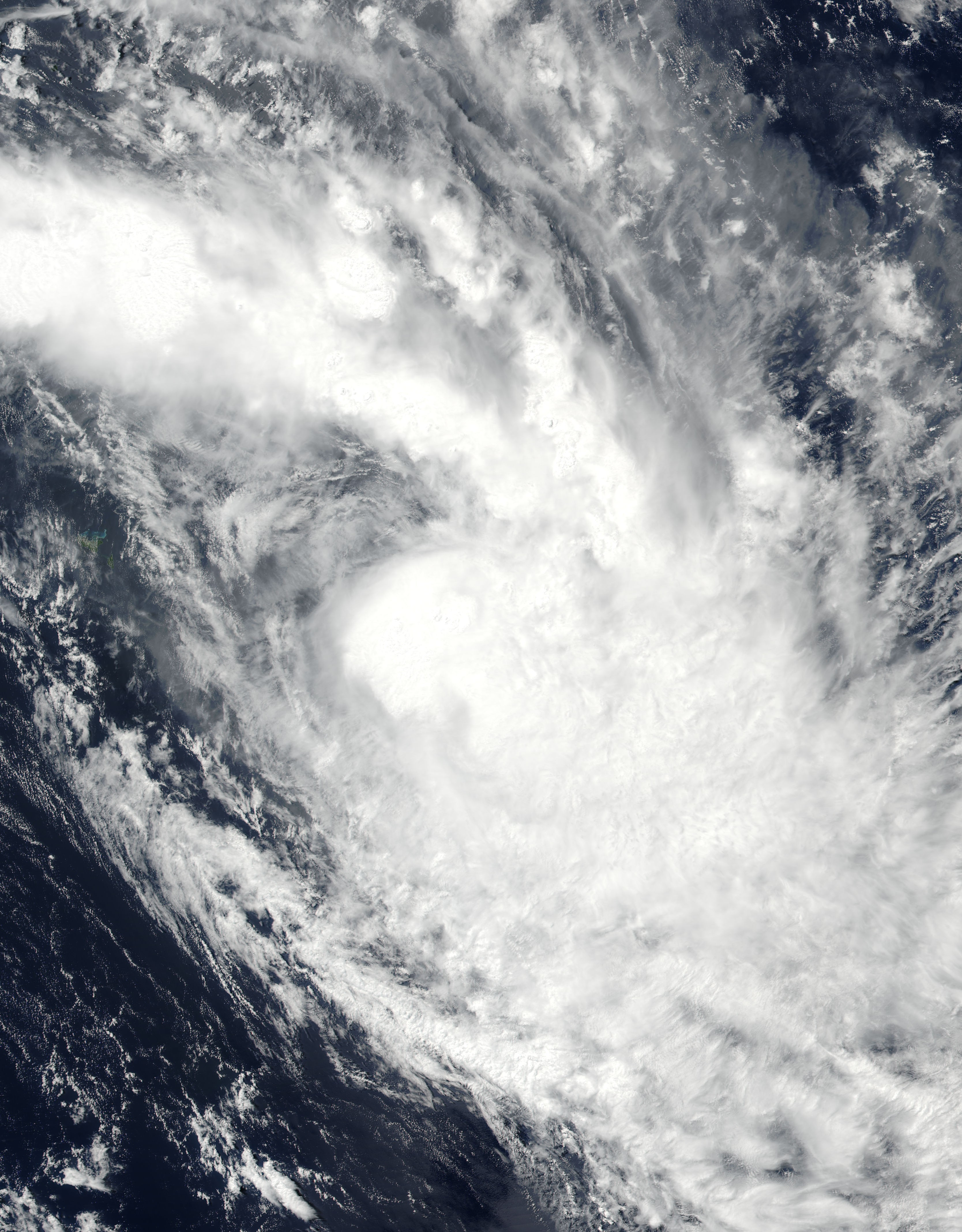
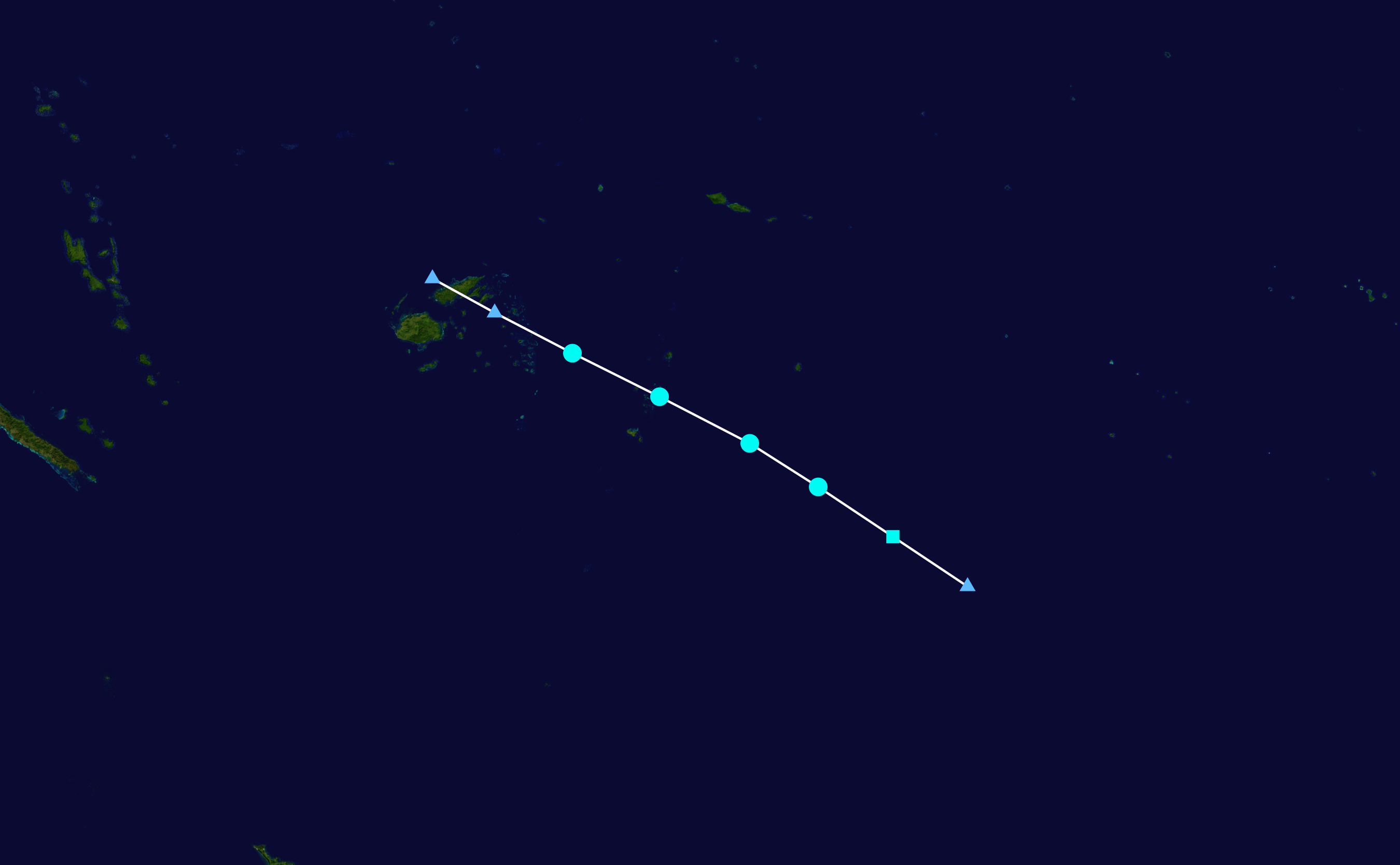
- Duration: February 16 – February 22
- Peak intensity: 55 km/h (35 mph) (10-min); 997 hPa (mbar)

A tropical depression developed between Vanuatu to the east and Fiji to the west on February 16. The initially disorganized system intensified until it reached its initial peak intensity of 45 knots while accelerating north. Immediately after, however, strong shear weakened the system, causing it to become disorganized again. On February 20, the system began to organize again, and the JTWC upgraded the system to Tropical Cyclone 08P as it neared landfall on Fiji before crossing the International Date Line. The cyclone later reached its secondary peak intensity of 40 knots before it underwent extratropical transition, a process that completed during the early hours of February 23.

=== Tropical Cyclone Bart ===
- Category 1 tropical cyclone (Australian scale)
- Tropical storm (SSHWS)
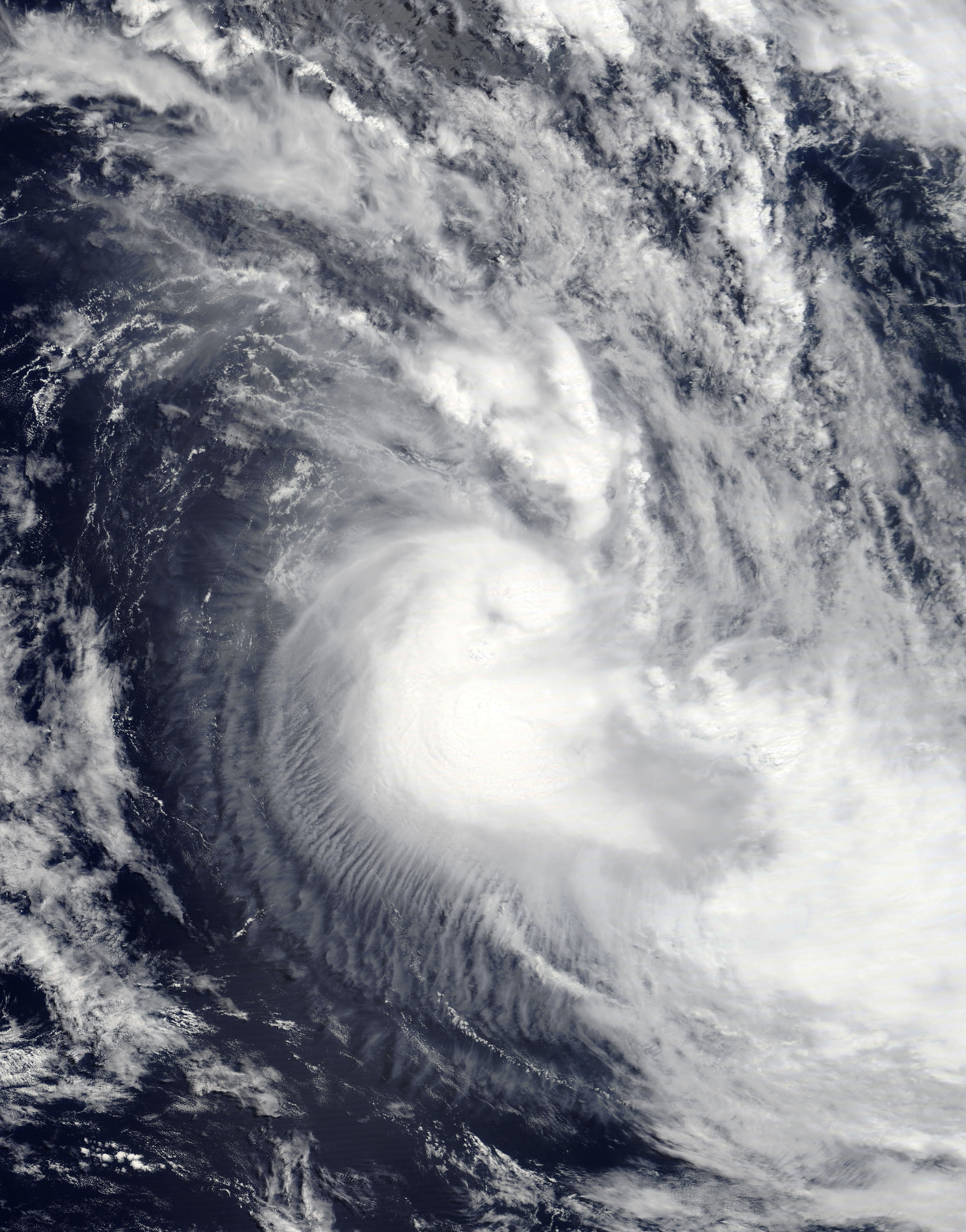
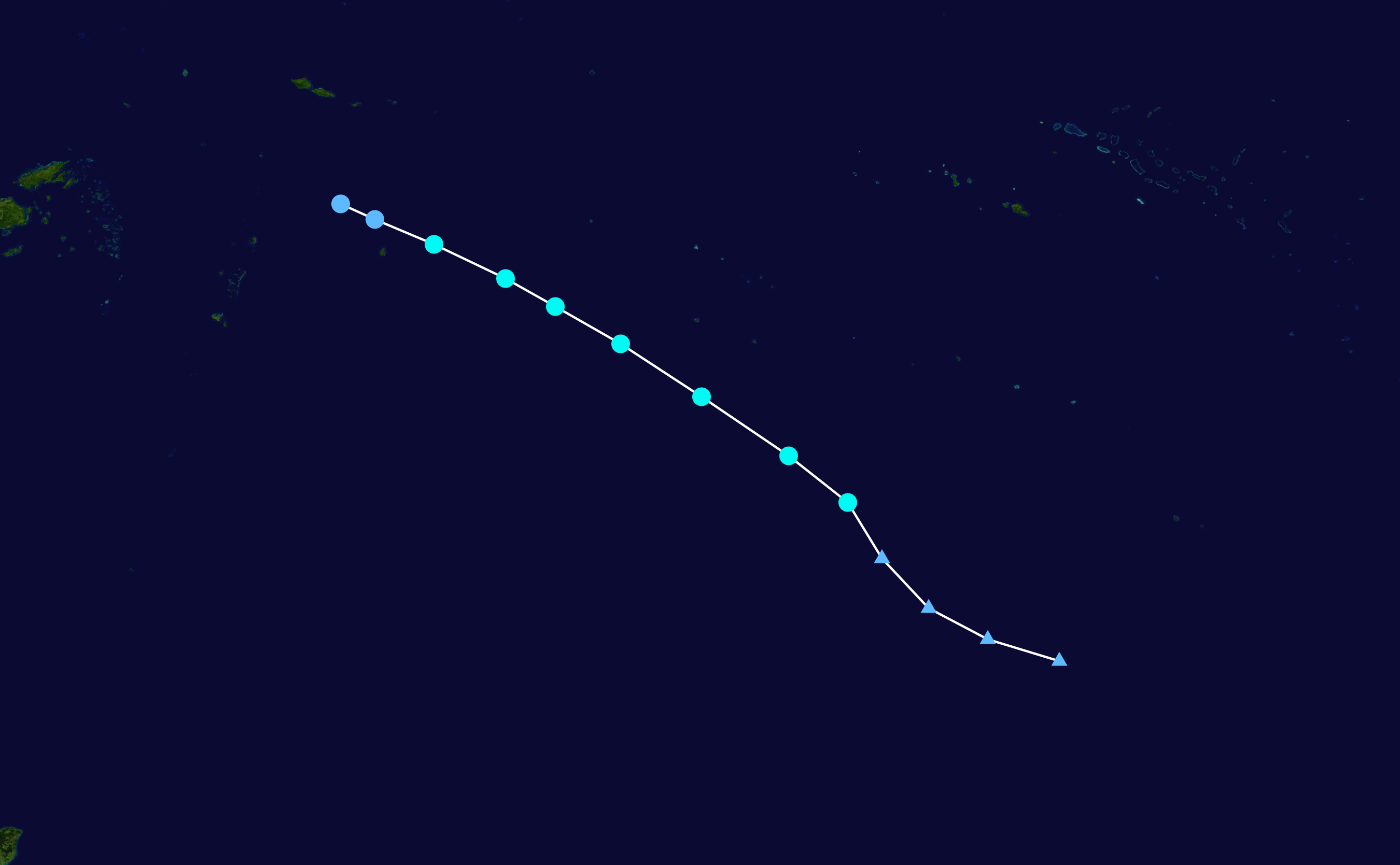
- Duration: February 19 – February 22
- Peak intensity: 75 km/h (45 mph) (10-min); 994 hPa (mbar)

During February 19, the FMS reported that Tropical Disturbance 15F had developed, about 300 km (185 mi) to the southwest of Apia, Samoa. Over the next couple of days, the system gradually developed further and became a tropical depression, as it moved south-eastwards within an area of low vertical wind shear. During February 21, the JTWC initiated advisories and designated it as Tropical Cyclone 07P, after an ASCAT satellite image had revealed the presence of 65–75 km/h (40–45 mph) winds, within its partially exposed circulation. The FMS subsequently named the system Bart as it had become a Category 1 tropical cyclone on the Australian scale, with peak 10-minute sustained wind speeds of 75 km/h (45 mph). After it had been named, Bart continued to move south-eastwards and passed to the west of the Southern Cook Islands, before it entered MetService's area of responsibility early on February 22. During that day, the system gradually transitioned and was reclassified as an extratropical cyclone, before it continued to weaken and dissipated over open seas. Gale-force winds, rain and thunderstorms were observed over the Southern Cook Islands, but there was no significant impact reported. Bart held the record for being the latest named cyclone in a respective season until Cyclone Urmil was named days after Bart in 2026.

=== Tropical Depression 19F ===
- Tropical depression (Australian scale)
- Tropical storm (SSHWS)
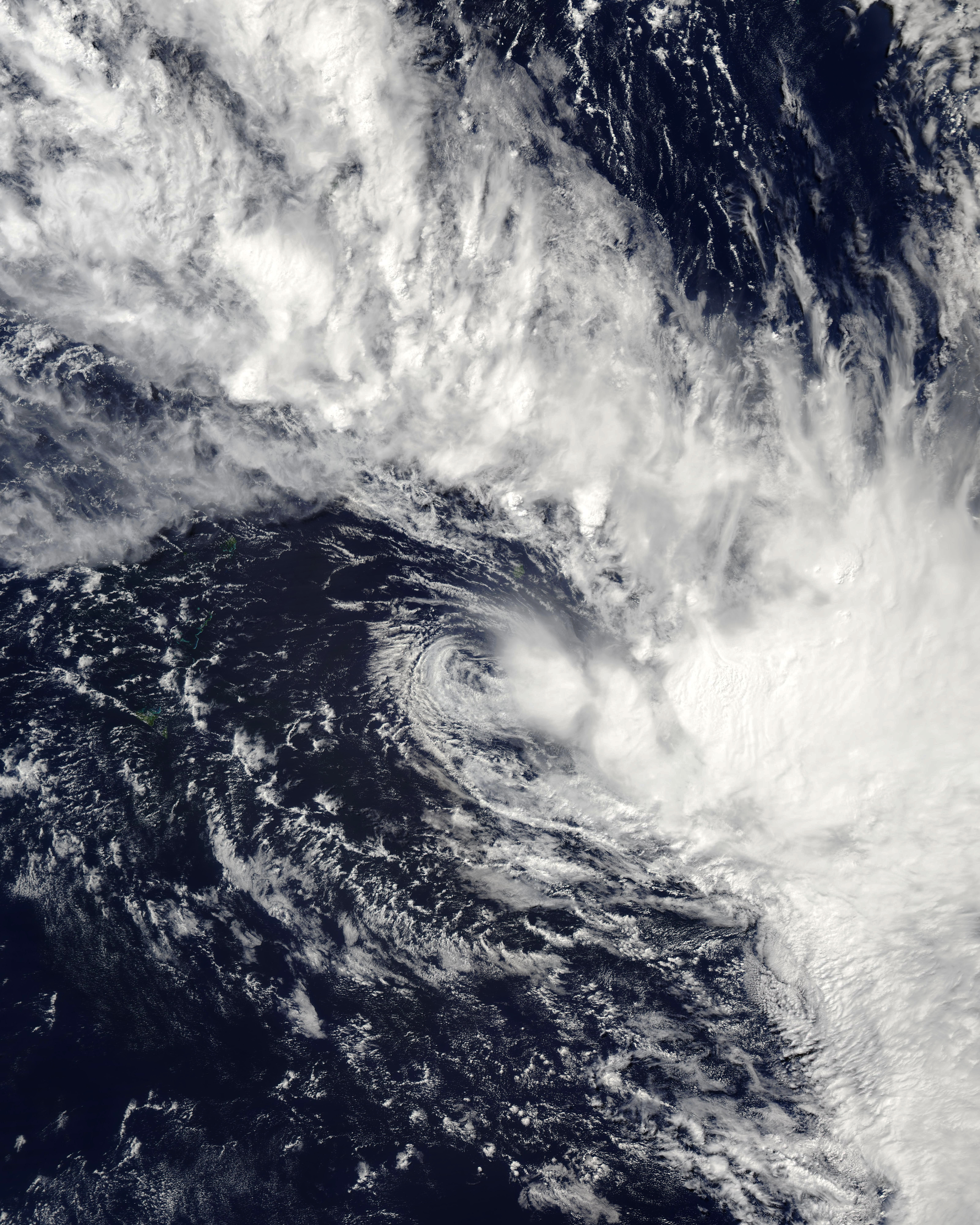
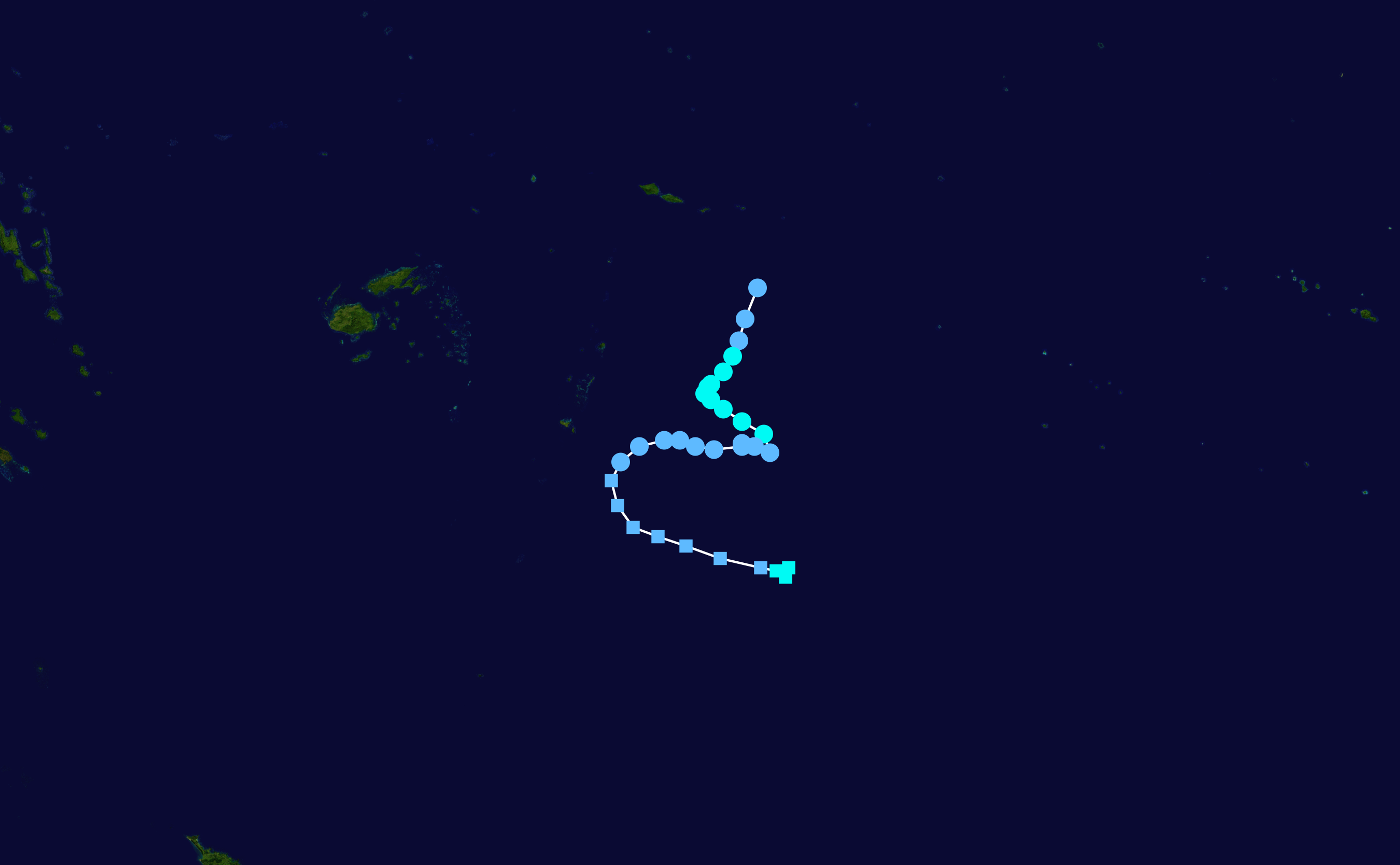
- Duration: April 1 – April 19
- Peak intensity: 65 km/h (40 mph) (1-min); 988 hPa (mbar)

Tropical Disturbance 19F was first noted on April 1, while it was located about 240 km (150 mi) to the northeast of Pago-Pago, in American Samoa. The system was poorly organised at this stage and lied within an upper-level monsoonal trough of low pressure in a moderate area of vertical wind shear. It existed for a very long period of time as it moved slowly, and ties Typhoon Noru for the longest lasting storm in 2017.

=== Severe Tropical Cyclone Cook ===
- Category 3 severe tropical cyclone (Australian scale)
- Category 2 tropical cyclone (SSHWS)
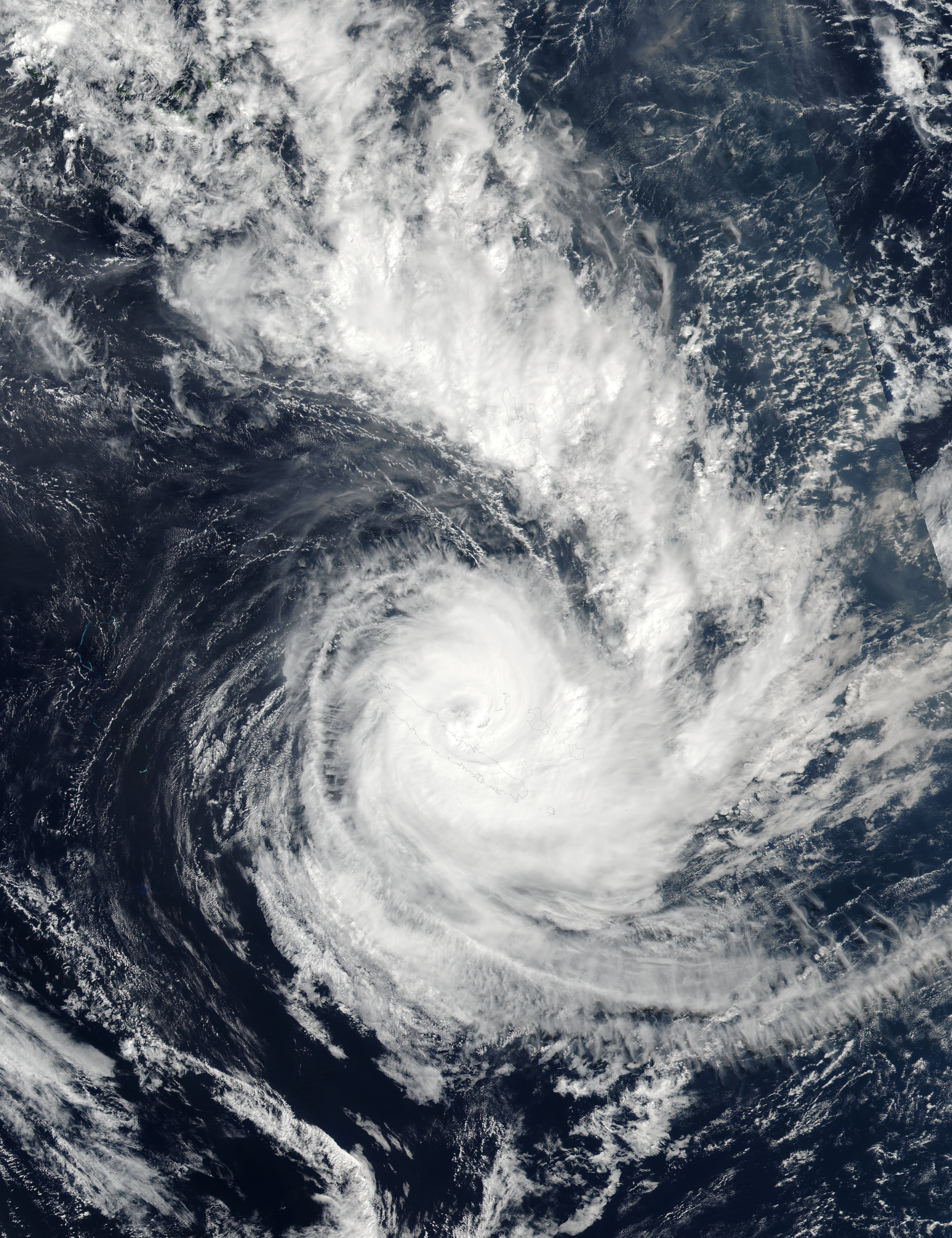
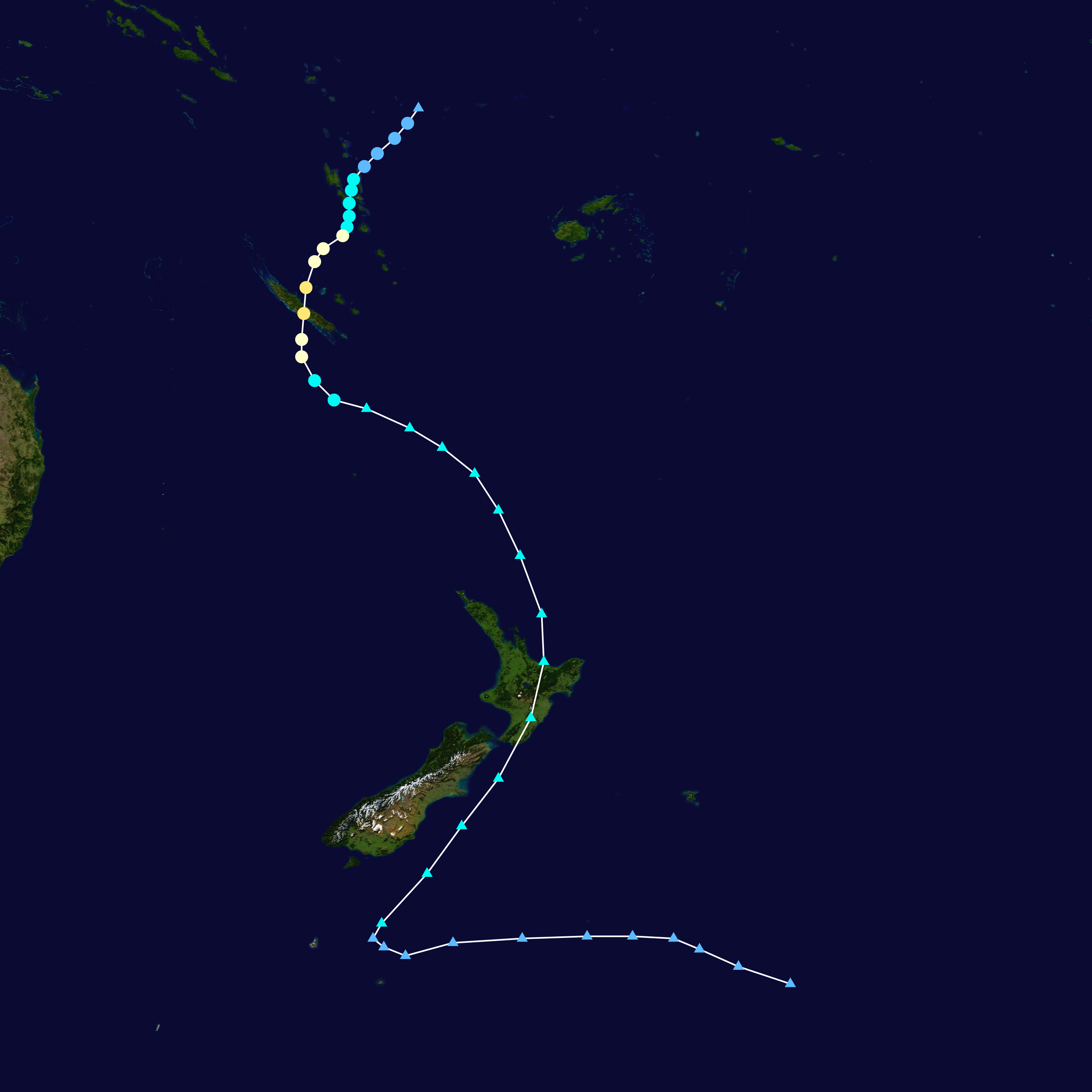
- Duration: April 5 – April 12
- Peak intensity: 155 km/h (100 mph) (10-min); 961 hPa (mbar)

Tropical Disturbance 20F was first noted during April 5, while it was located about 200 km (125 mi) to the northwest of the Fijian dependency of Rotuma. Over the next couple of days, the disturbance moved south-westwards and gradually developed further, before it was classified as a tropical depression by the FMS during April 7. The system subsequently continued to move south-westwards and passed near to or over the islands of Maewo, Ambae and Malakula in northern Vanuatu. As the system impacted Vanuatu, the JTWC and the FMS reported that the system had developed into a tropical cyclone, with the latter naming it as Cook. After Cook was named, the cyclone steadily intensified further and developed a 30 km (20 mi) eye, as it moved south-westwards towards New Caledonia. The FMS subsequently reported during April 9, that the system had become a Category 3 severe tropical cyclone, with peak 10-minute sustained winds of 155 km/h (95 mph). The JTWC subsequently reported that the cyclone had peaked with 1-minute sustained wind speeds of 165 km/h (105 mph), which made it equivalent to a Category 2 hurricane. Cook subsequently passed over New Caledonia during April 10, before it started to move southwards towards New Zealand and transition into an extratropical cyclone as it moved southwards towards New Zealand. The system was subsequently declared extratropical by both MetService and the JTWC during April 11, before it made landfall on New Zealand's North Island during April 13. After making landfall, the system moved south-southwest and moved to the east of the South Island during the following day before they were last noted during April 17.

=== Severe Tropical Cyclone Donna ===
- Category 5 severe tropical cyclone (Australian scale)
- Category 4 tropical cyclone (SSHWS)
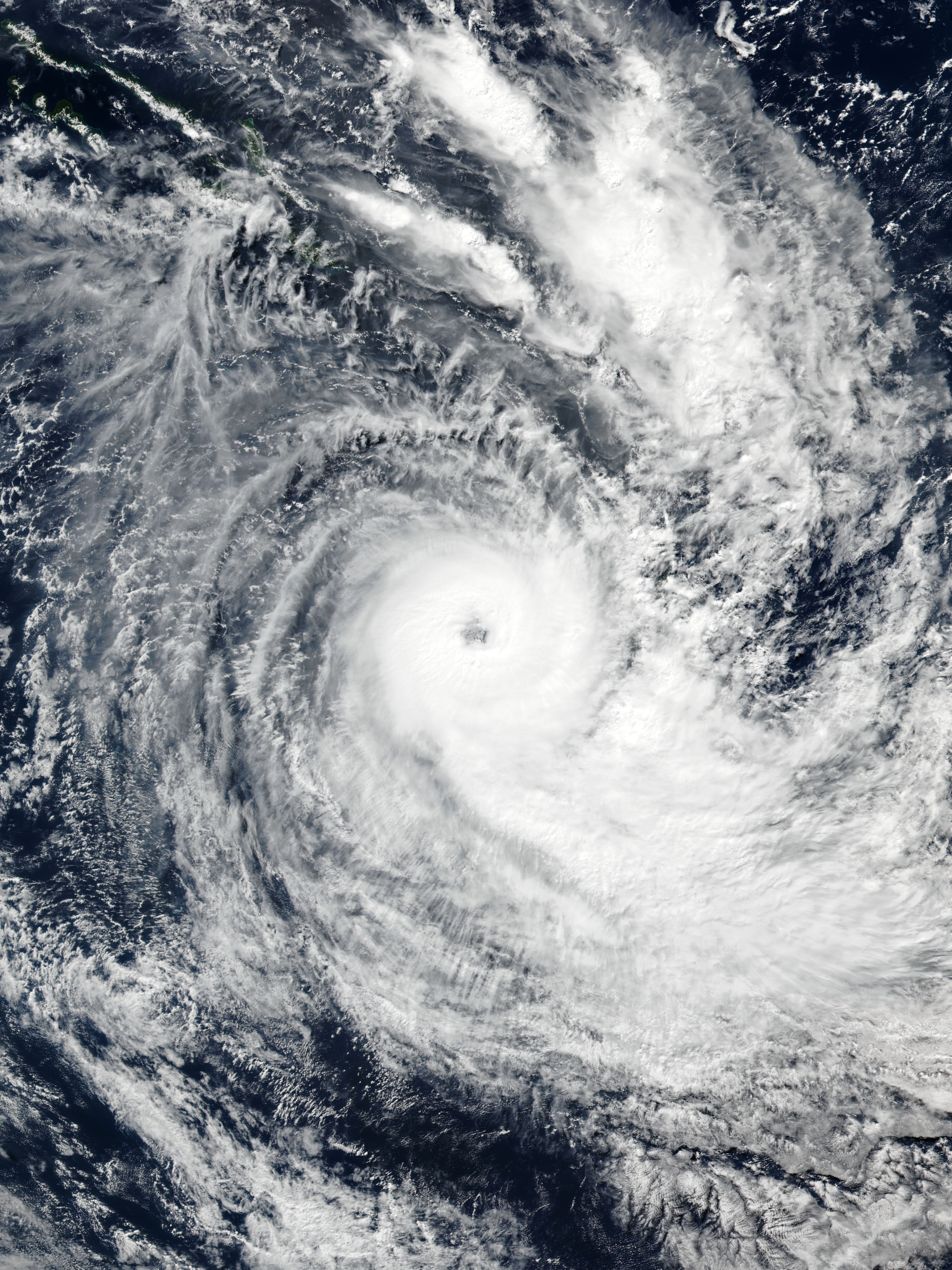
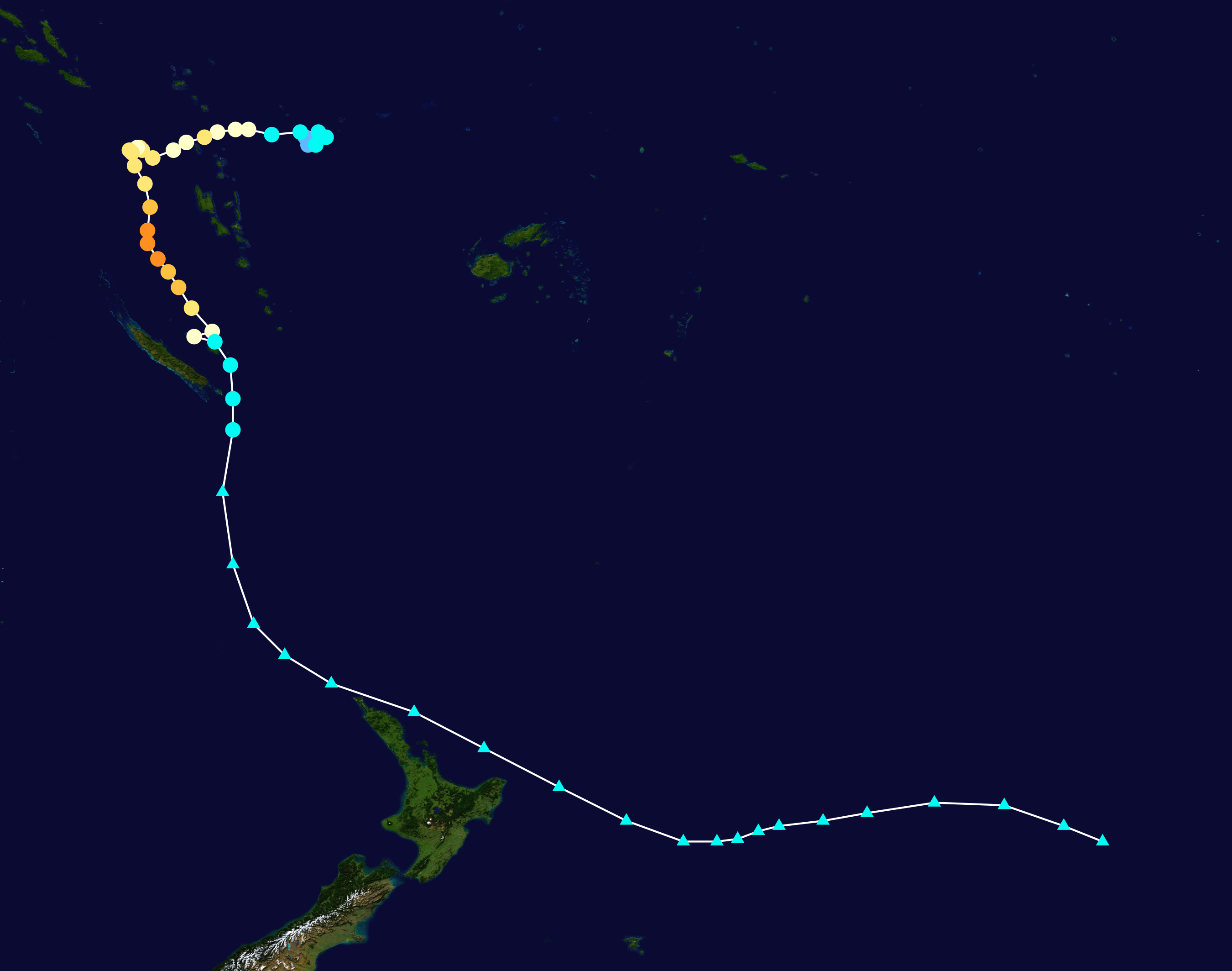
- Duration: May 1 – May 10
- Peak intensity: 205 km/h (125 mph) (10-min); 935 hPa (mbar)

Cyclone Donna was the strongest off-season South Pacific tropical cyclone on record during the month of May. Donna formed from an area of disturbed weather that was first monitored west-northwest of Fiji on 1 May 2017. The disturbance drifted eastward amid an increasingly favorable environment, and it was designated Tropical Depression 21F late on 2 May. Twelve hours later, it intensified into a Category 1 on the Australian tropical cyclone scale and was designated Tropical Cyclone Donna as the storm's motion shifted west and then south. After reaching its initial peak as a Category 4 cyclone early on 6 May, the effects of wind shear and upwelling caused the storm to weaken. However, it reintensified into a Category 5 cyclone on 8 May. Soon after, Donna entered a region of strong westerly flow and began to rapidly weaken. Continuing to accelerate in a southerly direction, Donna eventually weakened into a tropical low on 10 May. By 16 May, Donna's remnants had fully dissipated.

=== Tropical Cyclone Ella ===
- Category 2 tropical cyclone (Australian scale)
- Category 1 tropical cyclone (SSHWS)
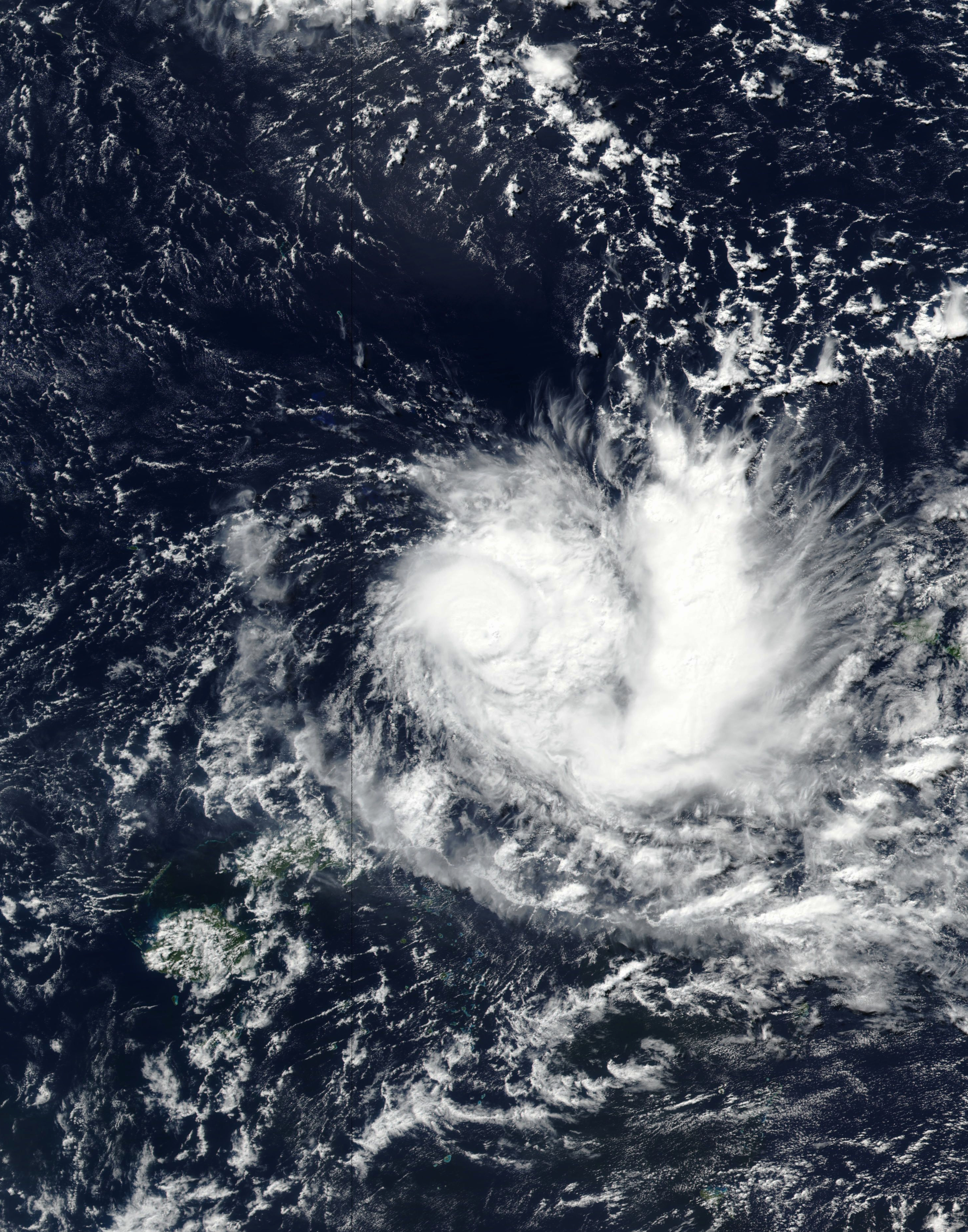
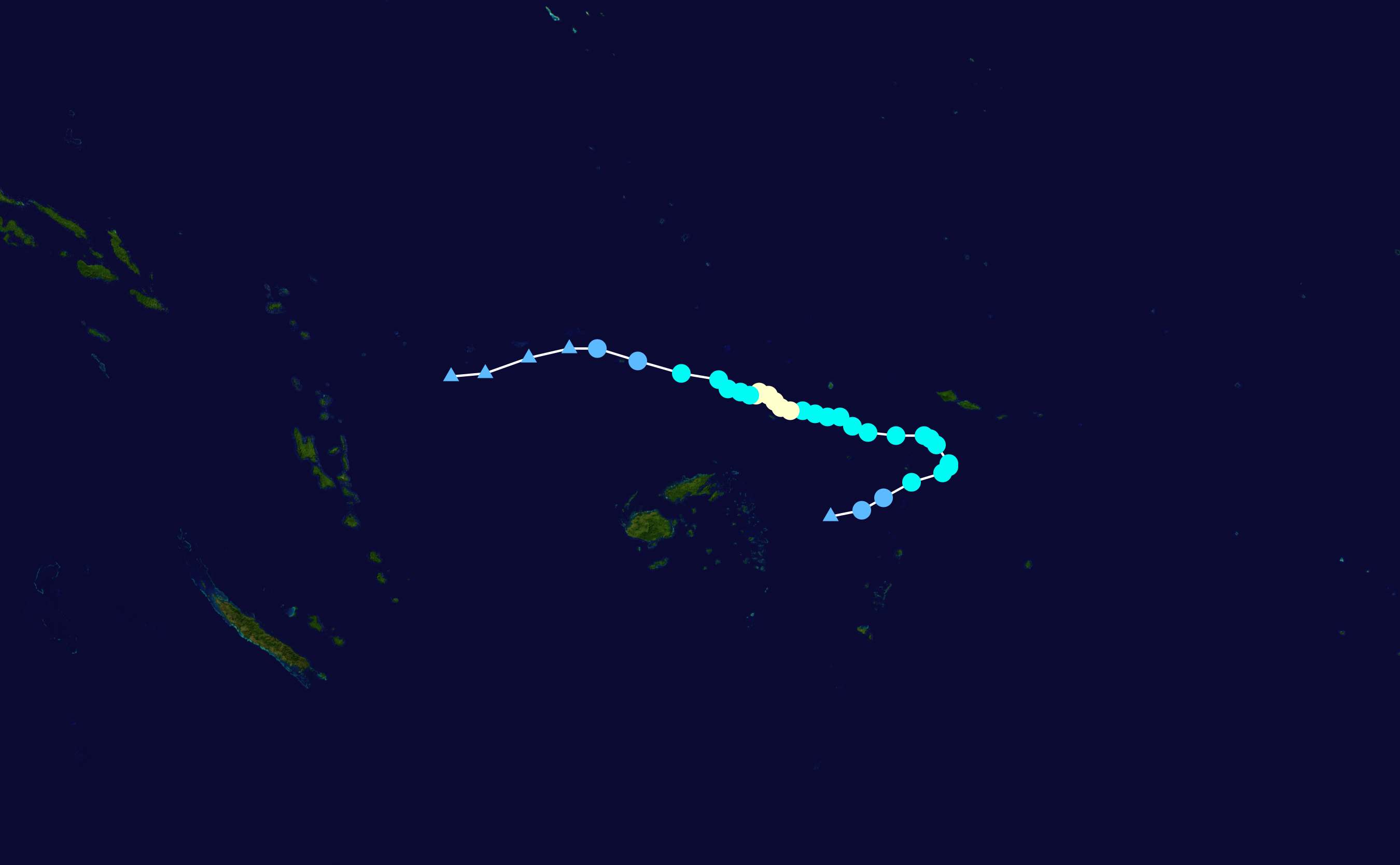
- Duration: May 7 – May 14
- Peak intensity: 110 km/h (70 mph) (10-min); 977 hPa (mbar)

During May 7, the FMS started to monitor Tropical Disturbance 22F that had developed within a trough of low pressure about 470 km (290 mi) to the northeast of Suva, Fiji. Amid generally favorable environmental conditions, Tropical Depression 22F developed southwest of American Samoa on 9 May. Just three hours later, the system intensified into a Category 1 tropical cyclone on the Australian scale, and was named Ella by the Fiji Meteorological Service (FMS).

=== Other systems ===
During November 12, the first tropical disturbance, Tropical Disturbance 01F, of the season developed, about 300 km (185 mi) to the northeast of the island nation, Niue. 01F was poorly organised and over the next day atmospheric convection surrounding the system significantly decreased as it moved south-eastwards, within an area of moderate to high vertical wind shear. As a result, 01F was subsequently last noted during November 13, as it was not expected to develop into a tropical cyclone. Tropical Disturbance 02F subsequently developed during November 23, around 300 km (185 mi) to the northeast of Pago Pago in American Samoa. Over the next few days, the system remained poorly organised as it slowly moved south-eastwards, before the FMS reported that 02F was not expected to develop into a tropical cyclone and issued its last advisory on the system. During November 26, the third tropical disturbance of the season moved into the basin from the Australian region, while it was located about 820 km (510 mi) to the northwest of Nouméa, New Caledonia. Over the next couple of days, 03F moved eastwards towards Vanuatu and remained poorly organised, before the FMS issued its last advisory on the system during November 30.

During the first half of January 2017, Tropical Disturbances 06F, 07F and 08F developed in quick succession. Tropical Disturbance 06F developed over the Solomon Islands on 2 January, and dissipated four days later. Tropical Disturbances 07F and 08F both formed on 10 January. The former meandered around French Polynesia before it dissipated on 20 January, while the latter degenerated within 24 hours near Fiji. Tropical Disturbance 12F developed over Fiji on February 15, and moved around the archipelago erratically for the next nine days before dissipating. On February 23, Tropical Disturbance 16F formed well to the east of Vanuatu, and stalled there for the next few days before dissipating on February 26.

On March 4, Tropical Disturbance 17F developed in roughly the same region as its predecessor 16F. However, it dissipated just one day later. Tropical Disturbance 18F developed along a pre-frontal trough of low pressure during March 18, about 455 km (285 mi) to the north of Suva, Fiji. Over the next couple of days, the system and associated trough of low pressure, moved south-eastwards towards Tonga, before the disturbance was last noted during March 21. Cloud bands associated with the trough brought heavy rain and flooding to the Northern Division.

== Storm names ==
Within the Southern Pacific a tropical depression is judged to have reached tropical cyclone intensity should it reach winds of 65 km/h (40 mph) and it is evident that gales are occurring at least halfway around the center. Tropical depressions that intensify into a tropical cyclone between the Equator and 25°S and between 160°E and 120°W are named by the FMS. However, should a tropical depression intensify to the south of 25°S between 160°E and 120°W it will be named by MetService in conjunction with the FMS. If a tropical cyclone moves out of the basin and into the Australian region, it will retain its original name. The names Cook and Donna would be used for the first and only time this year, after replacing the names Cora and Dani after the 1998-99 season. The names that were used for the 2016–17 season are listed below:

- Bart
- Cook
- Donna
- Ella

=== Retirement ===
After the season, the names Cook and Donna were both retired, and replaced with Crystal and Dean respectively.

== Season effects ==
This table lists all the storms that developed in the South Pacific to the east of longitude 160°E during the 2016–17 season. It includes their intensity on the Australian tropical cyclone intensity scale, duration, name, where they affected, deaths and damages (in 2016 USD).

Name	Dates	Peak intensity			Areas affected	Damage (USD)	Deaths	Ref(s).
Name	Dates	Category	Wind speed	Pressure	Areas affected	Damage (USD)	Deaths	Ref(s).
01F	November 12–13	Tropical disturbance	Not specified	1,008 hPa (29.77 inHg)	None	None	None	
02F	November 23–27	Tropical disturbance	Not specified	1,006 hPa (29.71 inHg)	None	None	None	
03F	November 29–30	Tropical disturbance	Not specified	1,000 hPa (29.53 inHg)	None	None	None	
04F	December 12–23	Tropical depression	45 km/h (30 mph)	998 hPa (29.47 inHg)	Fiji	$4.7 million	None	
05F	December 21–26	Tropical depression	Not specified	1,005 hPa (29.68 inHg)	None	None	None	
06F	January 2–6	Tropical disturbance	Not specified	1,002 hPa (29.59 inHg)	None	None	None	
07F	January 10–20	Tropical disturbance	Not specified	998 hPa (29.47 inHg)	None	None	None	
08F	January 10–11	Tropical disturbance	Not specified	1,009 hPa (29.80 inHg)	None	None	None	
09F	February 5–11	Tropical depression	Not specified	999 hPa (29.50 inHg)	Fiji	None	None	
10F	February 7–11	Tropical depression	Not specified	993 hPa (29.32 inHg)	Vanuatu, Fiji	None	None	
11F	February 9–12	Tropical depression	Not specified	1,002 hPa (29.59 inHg)	Vanuatu, Fiji	None	None	
12F	February 15–24	Tropical disturbance	Not specified	1,002 hPa (29.59 inHg)	Fiji	None	None	
13F	February 15–18	Tropical depression	Not specified	998 hPa (29.47 inHg)	None	None	None	
14F	February 16–22	Tropical depression	55 km/h (35 mph)	997 hPa (29.44 inHg)	Fiji	None	None	
Bart	February 19–22	Category 1 tropical cyclone	75 km/h (45 mph)	994 hPa (29.35 inHg)	Southern Cook Islands	None	None	
16F	February 23–26	Tropical disturbance	Not specified	1,005 hPa (29.68 inHg)	None	None	None	
17F	March 4–5	Tropical disturbance	Not specified	1,006 hPa (29.71 inHg)	None	None	None	
18F	March 19–21	Tropical disturbance	Not specified	1,007 hPa (29.74 inHg)	None	None	None	
19F	April 1–20	Tropical depression	Not specified	988 hPa (29.18 inHg)	Samoa, Niue	None	None	
Cook	April 6–11	Category 3 severe tropical cyclone	155 km/h (95 mph)	961 hPa (28.38 inHg)	Vanuatu, New Caledonia, New Zealand	$33 million	1	
Donna	May 1–10	Category 5 severe tropical cyclone	205 km/h (125 mph)	935 hPa (27.61 inHg)	Solomon Islands, Vanuatu, Fiji; New Caledonia, New Zealand	$10 million	2	
Ella	May 7–14	Category 2 tropical cyclone	110 km/h (70 mph)	977 hPa (28.85 inHg)	Samoan Islands, Tonga, Wallis and Futuna	None	None	
Season aggregates
22 systems	November 12, 2016 – May 14, 2017		205 km/h (125 mph)	935 hPa (27.61 inHg)		$47.7 million	3	

== See also ==
- Weather of 2016 and 2017
- Tropical cyclones in 2016 and 2017
- List of South Pacific cyclone seasons
- List of off-season South Pacific tropical cyclones
- Atlantic hurricane seasons: 2016, 2017
- Pacific hurricane seasons: 2016, 2017
- Pacific typhoon seasons: 2016, 2017
- North Indian Ocean cyclone seasons: 2016, 2017
- 2016–17 Australian region cyclone season
- 2016–17 South-West Indian Ocean cyclone season
- South Atlantic tropical cyclone
