= Philip Loeb =

American actor

- Philip Loeb
- Born: March 28, 1891; Philadelphia, Pennsylvania, U.S.
- Died: September 1, 1955 (aged 64); Manhattan, New York City, U.S.
- Spouse: Jeanne La Gue (m. 1920; div. 1940)
- Children: 1

Philip Loeb (March 28, 1891 – September 1, 1955), was an American stage, film, and television actor, director and author, perhaps best remembered for playing Jake Goldberg in The Goldbergs. He was blacklisted under McCarthyism and committed suicide.

== Early life ==
Philip Loeb was born March 28, 1891, in Philadelphia, Pennsylvania. He first performed in a high school production of Lady Gregory's The Workhouse Ward. After serving in the Army, he obtained a series of minor stage roles. He also worked as stage manager of The Green Goddess play at the Booth Theatre in 1921.

== Theatrical career ==
Loeb's theatrical career flourished in the 1920s when he became associated with the newly formed Theatre Guild in New York City. Although his stage work diminished in the next decade when he got involved with Actors' Equity Association (it was his time with Equity that purportedly prompted the later charges against him of Communist leanings), he did enjoy a big success in 1937-38 with Room Service, which ran for 500 performances at Broadway's Cort Theatre. He then co-authored the film adaptation of Room Service (1938) starring the Marx Brothers. During the course of his theatrical career, Loeb directed seven Broadway productions and appeared in 36 Broadway plays: his first, If I Were King, in 1916 at the Shubert Theatre; and his last, Time Out For Ginger, in 1953 at the Lyceum Theatre.

== The Goldbergs ==
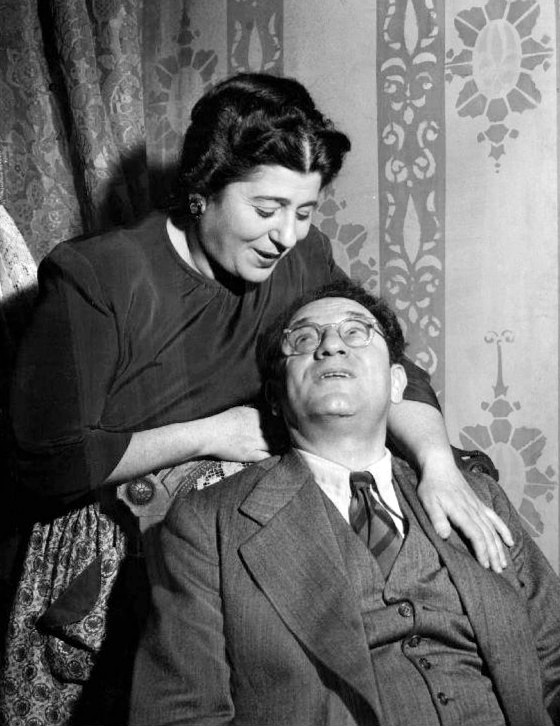
Loeb as Jake Goldberg, with Gertrude Berg as Molly, on the CBS TV show, The Goldbergs, in 1949.

In 1948, Loeb portrayed the role of Jake Goldberg in Gertrude Berg's Broadway play Me and Molly, which was based on Berg's long-running radio show The Goldbergs. The following year, he reprised the role on the television adaptation of The Goldbergs on CBS. Loeb quickly became a viewer favorite as Jake, the exasperated, loving husband to Berg's meddlesome, bighearted Molly Goldberg. He also appeared in the 1950 film adaptation of the series.

== Political charges ==
Over the course of his career, Loeb became the subject of repeated political debates. In July 1940, he was accused of being a Communist by Representative William P. Lambertson of Kansas, along with seven other members of the Council of Actors Equity Association - Sam Jaffe, Emily Marsh, Hiram Sherman, Leroy MacLean, Edith Van Cleve, and Alan Hewitt.

Loeb denied these accusations in a public letter shortly afterwards. He requested that Lambertson either formally retract these statements, or that he explicitly provide "the sources of information that led [him] to make them."

The Equity Council also adopted a resolution seeking that a federal agency, such as the Dies Committee on Un-American activities, officially investigate these charges. This request was never honored by the Dies or another governing body. However, in response, Lambertson presented the Congressional Record with his charges, a pamphlet, and two newspaper clippings supporting Soviet forces, each reported to contain an equity councilor's name. Loeb, with the others, again denied all Communist influence and argued that such evidence was insufficient in proving otherwise.

Despite Loeb's insistence to the contrary, these initial charges regarding the Actors Equity Association, as well as his other pro-union activities (including work with Elia Kazan, member of the American Communist Party), led to Loeb's growing reputation as a Communist sympathizer. This later resulted in his involvement with the Hollywood Blacklist.

== Blacklisting ==
In June 1950, Loeb was named as a Communist in Red Channels: The Report of Communist Influence in Radio and Television. He denied the accusation, but the chief sponsor of The Goldbergs, General Foods, demanded that he must be dropped from the show's cast due to his "controversiality". Gertrude Berg (who had created the show and owned it on both radio and TV) refused to fire Loeb. She and Loeb stalled and resisted the sponsor's mandate for over a year, but he eventually resigned, accepting a settlement which was estimated at $40,000 ($485,000 today). His last acting job was in the 1953 Broadway production of Time Out for Ginger, and its subsequent Chicago production in 1954.

== Death ==
In his 1996 memoir Inside Out, blacklisted screenwriter Walter Bernstein described Loeb as being depressed as a result of the blacklist. Loeb was sole supporter of a schizophrenic son, and was burdened with financial problems. Bernstein, who belonged to a circle of friends around Loeb that included Zero Mostel, wrote, "I never saw Loeb smile, even when Zero was at his hilarious best." The following year, on September 1, 1955, Loeb committed suicide by taking an overdose of sleeping pills in the Taft Hotel in midtown Manhattan. No note was found. He was buried in Mount Sinai Cemetery in his native Philadelphia.

== Legacy ==
In Martin Ritt's The Front—a 1976 film starring Woody Allen that dramatizes the blacklist—Loeb's descent into suicide was captured in the character Hecky Brown, portrayed by Loeb's blacklisted friend Zero Mostel. The screenplay was written by Loeb's blacklisted friend Walter Bernstein. Loeb's case was also noted in the Philip Roth novel I Married a Communist (1998).

The American Academy of Dramatic Arts, where Loeb was an instructor, awards an annual scholarship in his memory. Actors' Equity briefly issued a Philip Loeb Humanitarian Award; recipients included theatrical producer William Ross, and actor Iggie Wolfington.

== Filmography ==
| Year | Title | Role | Notes |
|---|---|---|---|
| 1938 | Room Service | Timothy Hogarth | |
| 1938 | Sweethearts | Samuel Silver | Uncredited |
| 1947 | A Double Life | Max Lasker | |
| 1950 | The Goldbergs | Jake Goldberg | |
