= The Goldbergs =

The Goldbergs may refer to:

- The Goldbergs (broadcast series), a comedy-drama broadcast from 1929 to 1946 on American radio and from 1949 to 1956 on American television
- The Goldbergs (film), a 1950 comedy film
- The Goldbergs (2013 TV series), a 2013 American comedy series on ABC
- A nickname for the Goldberg Variations by J. S. Bach
