= Eli Mintz =

American actor

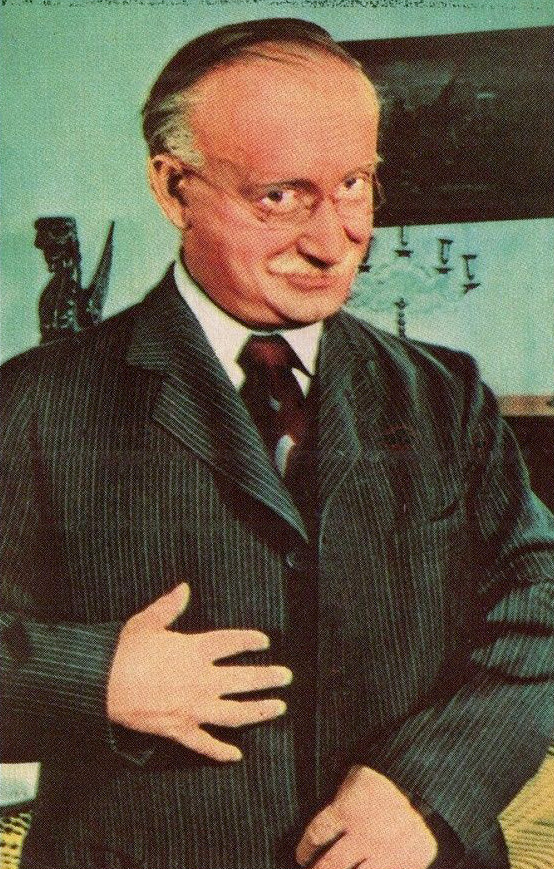
Mintz in 1953.

Eli Mintz (born Edward Satz, 1 August 1904 – 8 June 1988) was an American actor of Polish-Austrian Jewish descent.

== Biography ==
Born in Lemberg, Austrian-Hungary (now Lviv, Ukraine), the son of a tailor, Mintz began acting professionally as a child in the theatre, with his first performance being in a production of The Dybbuk. Employed as a waiter on the steamship Lituania, he immigrated to the United States in 1927 with the intent of pursuing a career as an actor. His brother Ludwig Satz was already working as an actor in New York City before his arrival. Mintz worked as a waiter, a presser and a clothing salesman in New York City until he procured his first acting jobs within Yiddish theater during the 1930s. He decided to use the stage name Eli Mintz at this time, largely so that his name would be separated from his brother's career.

Mintz's first major break came in 1948 when he was cast as Uncle David in Gertrude Berg's Broadway play Me and Molly. The work was based on the long-running radio drama The Goldbergs where Menasha Skulnick played the role of Uncle David. Skulnick was unable to reprise his role on the stage, and since he was Mintz's friend, Skulnick recommended that Mintz be given the role. Mintz played the role so admirably that he was asked to play the part in the television adaptation of The Goldbergs which ran from 1949 through 1956. He also portrayed the role in the 1950 movie adaptation.

After the end of The Goldbergs television series, Mintz remained active as an actor in theatre, television, and film. On Broadway he appeared in The 49th Cousin (1960–1961), I Was Dancing (1964), Catch Me If You Can (1965), Jimmy Shine (1968–1969), and Molly (1973). He also appeared in the films The Proud Rebel (1958), Murder, Inc. (1960), Won Ton Ton, the Dog Who Saved Hollywood (1976), Boardwalk (1979), and Stardust Memories (1980). His television credits include appearances on The Doctor (1953), Kraft Television Theatre (1953–1954), Studio One (1951–1955), Playhouse 90 (1957), I Spy (1957), Lamp Unto My Feet (1958), Play of the Week (1960), Naked City (1962), The United States Steel Hour (1962), and Ben Casey (1962) among others. In 1980 he was nominated for a Daytime Emmy Award for his portrayal of the recurring character of Locksmith on the soap opera All My Children.

Mintz had two daughters, Leona Schwartz and Iva Loftman, with his wife Hasha. They also had four grandchildren: Adam and Elena Loftman and Paulette and Monica Schwartz. He died from complications of pneumonia at Point Pleasant Hospital in Point Pleasant, New Jersey, aged 83. He was a resident of Brick Township, New Jersey.

== Partial filmography ==
- She (1935) - (uncredited)
- The Goldbergs (1950) - Uncle David
- The Proud Rebel (1958) - Mr. Gorman
- Murder, Inc. (1960) - Joe Rosen
- Won Ton Ton, the Dog Who Saved Hollywood (1976) - Tailor
- Boardwalk (1979) - Friedman
- Stardust Memories (1980) - Old Man (final film role)
