= Molly (musical) =

Molly is a musical with lyrics by Leonard Adelson and Mack David and music by Jerry Livingston. The musical book by Louis A. Garfinkle and Adelson is based on characters from Gertrude Berg's The Goldbergs. The musical premiered on Broadway on September 27, 1973 at the Alvin Theatre where it ran for a total of 108 performances, closing on December 29, 1973. The cast included Kaye Ballard as Molly, Lee Wallace as Jake, Eli Mintz as Uncle David, and Swen Swenson as Michael Stone.
