= Me and Molly =

Play written by Gertrude Berg

- Original language: English
- Written by: Gertrude Berg
- Based on: The Goldbergs
- Subject: Domestic situations
- Genre: Comedy
- Setting: Goldberg apartment, The Bronx, 1919

Premiere
- Date: February 26, 1948
- Place: Belasco Theatre
- Directed by: Ezra Stone

Me and Molly is a three-act play with eight scenes by Gertrude Berg, based on Berg's long-running radio drama The Goldbergs. It has a large cast, one setting, and moderate pacing. It is a domestic situation comedy, bordering on soap opera, as Jake Goldberg tries to start his own business while his family adjusts to life in a new apartment.

It was originally produced by Herbert Kenwith at the Belasco Theatre during February 1948, with staging by Ezra Stone and starring Berg and Philip Loeb. After its run completed, the play was followed by a television series (1949) and a film (1950) that used some of the same characters and performers, but followed different storylines.

The drama critic of New York Daily News had selected the season's ten best plays every year since 1920. For the 1947–1948 season, John Chapman chose Me and Molly for the tenth spot, an unexpected honor for neophyte playwright Gertrude Berg.

== Characters ==
There were many featured parts and walk-on characters portraying neighbors, their children, and tradesmen which are omitted for clarity.

Leads

- Molly Goldberg is the linchpin of her family, who hopes to learn to write her own name.
- Jake Goldberg is Molly's husband, who yearns to be his own boss in the clothing industry.

Supporting

- Uncle David is the family's merry and wise elder, a secret benefactor.
- Sammy Goldberg is the Goldbergs 13-year-old son, preparing for his bar mitzvah.
- Rosie Goldberg is the Goldbergs 11 year-old piano-playing daughter.
- Cousin Simon is a wealthy clothes manufacturer, proud and pompous and a bit tight-fisted.
- Mr. Mendel is a bashful young bachelor, secretly fond of Vera.
- Vera Wertheimer is the young single piano teacher to Rosie.

== Synopsis ==
The year is 1919, and the Goldbergs have recently moved from "downtown" (a tenement) to "uptown" (a lower middle-class apartment). After the movers have finished bringing the Goldberg's possessions in, Molly is embarrassed when they ask her to sign the receipt. The play is a series of domestic situations like this, in which Molly and Jake try to fulfill their own aspirations while raising their children. Among other situations they encounter is helping Mr. Mendel and Vera Wertheimer get together as a couple, overcoming Jake's suspicion that Molly has pillaged their savings to buy Rosie a piano (a secret gift from Uncle David), and trying to persuade Cousin Simon to advance Jake the money to start his own business.

== Original production ==
=== Background ===
First public word of the play came in early December 1947, when Sam Zolotow revealed in The New York Times that Me and Molly would star its playwright Gertrude Berg and Philip Loeb. Zolotow also mentioned the play had four "angels": (Note: This was a theatrical term for financial backers, as opposed to the producer(s), who may or may not have a financial interest in the production.) producer Herbert Kenwith, with Paul Feigay, Oliver Smith, and David Cummings also backing it. Ezra Stone would direct; Hedda Hopper said that Philip Loeb had been Stone's teacher at the American Academy of Dramatic Arts during 1934, and had later directed him in his first Broadway play, Parade.

By December 18, 1947 Harry Horner had been signed to create the scenic design. A casting call for eleven-year-old girls and boys ages 7–12 was set for the Adelphi Theater on December 31, 1947, with Berg, Ezra Stone, and Herbert Kenwith heading the audition. Rehearsals started January 12, 1948, while within a week all the principal cast had been signed. Lehman Engel was hired to provide arrangements for musical accompaniment to Me and Molly.

=== Cast ===
Principal cast for the Philadelphia tryout and during the original Broadway run.
Role	Actor	Dates	Notes and sources
Molly Goldberg	Gertrude Berg	Feb 10, 1948 - Jul 10, 1948	Berg played the role on radio from 1929 through 1945; this was her first stage performance ever.
Jake Goldberg	Philip Loeb	Feb 10, 1948 - Jul 10, 1948	
Uncle David	Eli Mintz	Feb 10, 1948 - Jul 10, 1948	
Sammie Goldberg	Lester Carr	Feb 10, 1948 - Jul 10, 1948	
Rosie Goldberg	Joan Lazer	Feb 10, 1948 - May 9, 1948	While doing this run Lazer also performed as Jill Malone on the CBS radio drama Young Dr. Malone.
Rosie Goldberg	Nomi Mitty	May 10, 1948 - Jun 05, 1948	Mitty subbed when Lazer left for three weeks to film a part in The Undercover Man (1949).
Rosie Goldberg	Joan Lazer	Jun 06, 1948 - Jul 10, 1948	
Cousin Simon	Louis Sorin	Feb 10, 1948 - Jul 10, 1948	
Mr. Mendel	David Opatoshu	Feb 10, 1948 - Jul 10, 1948	
Vera Wertheimer	Margaret Feury	Feb 10, 1948 - Jul 10, 1948	

=== Tryouts ===
The play's first performance came on February 10, 1948, at the Locust Street Theatre in Philadelphia. The local reviewer recognized Me and Molly was "technically" soap opera, but felt "the end result is a warm, amusing and often touching Jewish folk-play, circa 1919". Cast, staging, and the set were all pleasing, and the opening night critic offered no suggestions for improvement.

=== Premiere and reception ===
After two weeks tryout, Me and Molly premiered at the Belasco Theatre on February 26, 1948. Critical opinion was positive for the play's colorful characters and human warmth. Brooks Atkinson said of Gertrude Berg's script "the artlessness is genuine and her family drama makes no pretentions to literature", while "the friendliness of her play and the simplicity of her characters are disarming and enjoyable". John Chapman of the Daily News thought where the play succeeded best was in Berg's deft touch with family bickering, making it amusing but never letting it get out of hand. He also praised Philip Loeb's acting and that of "Joan Lazer, as an exceptionally charming small daughter".

Associated Press columnist Jack O'Brian said Me and Molly accomplished the impossible "when a stage version of a soap opera provided a first night audience with generous helpings of good, warm humor." George Currie of the Brooklyn Daily Eagle described the play as "New York folklore" and ascribed to it "moments of high comedy" and "touching pathos". He offered the sole critical note when he opined that Rosie's new upright "looked mighty like a player piano".

Within two weeks of the premiere the producers began offering Sunday matinee and evening performances. The box office took in $11,000 the first week rising to $15,000 by the third.

=== Closing ===
'Me and Molly' closed at the Belasco on July 10, 1948, after 156 performances; according to critics, a victim of heat (Note: Broadway theaters at that time generally did not yet have air conditioning.) and high operating and production costs in Manhattan. The "angels" hadn't yet recouped their $60,000 initial investment.

=== Touring ===
Me and Molly opened on August 3, 1948, at the Flatbush Theatre in Brooklyn, for a week's run. All the original principals of the Broadway cast were on the tour, with the exception of Joan Lazer, whose Rosie Goldberg role was again taken by Nomi Mitty. After a week it moved to the Windsor Theatre in the Bronx, playing what was known as the "subway circuit".
