= Peggy Feury =

American actress (1924–1985)

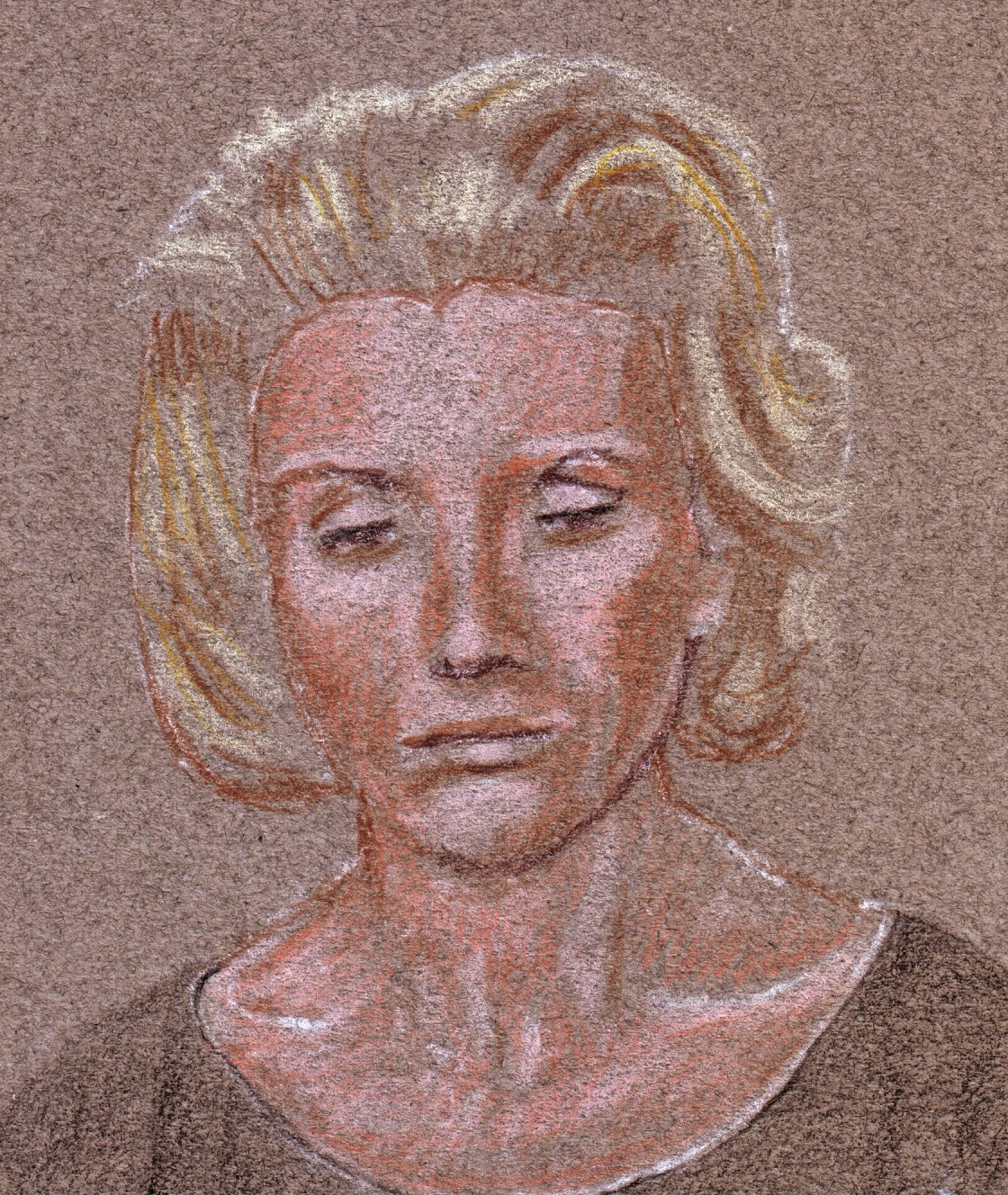
- Born: Margaret Feury; June 30, 1924; Jersey City, New Jersey, U.S.
- Died: November 20, 1985 (aged 61); West Hollywood, California, U.S.
- Other names: Peg Feury, Margaret Traylor
- Occupations: Actress, teacher
- Years active: 1948–1985
- Spouses: Louis S. Peterson (m. 1952; div. 1961) William Traylor (m. 1961)
- Children: 2, including Susan Traylor

Peggy Feury (born Margaret Feury; June 30, 1924 – November 20, 1985) was an American actress on Broadway, in films, and on television. She became a highly regarded acting teacher in New York and then in Los Angeles. Throughout her career, she taught many notable students.

== Education ==
Feury was born in Jersey City, New Jersey. Her father was Richard Feury; her mother, born in Ireland, was also Margaret Feury; and her younger sister was Elinor Feury. She graduated from Barnard College, then attended the Yale School of Drama, later studying with Lee Strasberg at the Actors Studio, and with Sanford Meisner at the Neighborhood Playhouse.

While at Yale, Feury met and then married her first husband, playwright Louis S. Peterson. (Note: Peterson first came to prominence in 1953 with the production of his play, the coming-of-age tale, Take a Giant Step. Peterson would go on to write scripts for TV and film.) Less than a decade later, following their divorce and Feury's remarriage, Peterson's semi-autobiographical play Entertain a Ghost was produced, chronicling a deteriorating marriage between a fictional playwright and actress with obvious parallels to Peterson and Feury. The play received from the Village Voice a positive and detailed review that expressed the feeling that the production should have run longer. It described it as "a daring and deeply exploratory new play, the best damned failure I've seen in years".

== Actress ==
As Margaret Feury she appeared on Broadway in Me and Molly; Sunday Breakfast (staged by noted acting teacher Stella Adler); Enter Laughing; Peer Gynt, starring John Garfield, Mildred Dunnock, and Karl Malden, directed by Lee Strasberg; The Grass Harp, directed by Actors Studio co-founder Robert Lewis; The Lady of the Camellias, directed by Franco Zeffirelli, Chekov's Three Sisters, directed by Strasberg (with Feury eventually replacing Geraldine Page as Olga), and The Turn of the Screw. Off-Broadway she starred in Frank Wedekind's Earth Spirit at the Provincetown Playhouse.

Between 1956 and 1969, the Actors Studio undertook a project to record and archive work that was being done there, including performances of scenes from dramatic literature. Her performances occur in recordings of Idiot's Delight, La Dolce Vita, Lie Down in Darkness, Mourning Becomes Electra, Ship of Fools, Ulysses, and others. These recordings have been archived as part of the University of Wisconsin Digital Collections. Feury participated in this project from its inception until her relocation to Los Angeles in December 1968.

Feury appeared in a number of television dramas beginning in the Golden Age of Television, including, in 1961, a significant role she played in “Murder is a Face I Know”, an episode from The Naked City, which can be found on the internet.

In November 1961, an early draft of the first scene of Edward Albee’s play, Who's Afraid of Virginia Woolf? was presented on the public television program Playwright at Work. The characters George and Martha – which would later be originated on stage by Arthur Hill and Uta Hagen, and on screen by Richard Burton and Elizabeth Taylor – were portrayed by Shepperd Strudwick and Feury.

On October 2, 1977, Feury appeared in Iowa, the second season premiere of Visions, PBS's Peabody Award-winning dramatic anthology series; it was directed by Lloyd Richards, and was playwright Murray Mednick's television debut. The critical reaction was disappointment, but the actors fared better, Feury in particular. As the unwilling nursing home resident whose disjointed recollections provide her granddaughter an invaluable connection to her Iowa roots, Feury's portrayal was judged "[b]y far the best acting performance" by The Hartford Courant. Her performance, as the character veers "from family feeling to suspicion to self-absorbed recollection" – was noted by The Boston Globe, with The Los Angeles Times citing her "almost effortless grace" and "marvelous ferocity." Critic James Wolcott writes:

One scene teems with unruly life: Eileen visits her grandmother (Peggy Feury) in the nursing home, and the grandma's semi-senile outbursts have a crazy, cawing theatricality. "This is a cattle yard," says Feury's crone as the camera stares down the discarded people. "Bellowing, constant bellowing." Another patient – babbling "Operator, operator, operator" – is wheeled across the screen and grandma, like an Alice-in-Wonderland queen, issues a command: "Choke her!" This disreputably funny scene is capped when a nurse happens by and – perfect joke – turns out to be a Lily Tomlin lookalike.

In 1982, Feury appeared as "Colonel Buckholtz," a perfectionist colonel who inspects Margaret Houlihan and the nurses in "Hey, Look Me Over," the opening episode of M*A*S*H Season 11.

Feury's film credits include Matt Cimber's The Witch Who Came from the Sea (1976), Richard C. Sarafian's The Next Man (1976) starring Sean Connery, Elia Kazan's film of The Last Tycoon (1976), starring Robert De Niro, Carl Reiner's All of Me (1984), starring Steve Martin and Lily Tomlin, Ken Russell's Crimes of Passion (1984), and Feury's final screen performance, in 1918 (1985), written by Horton Foote. A brief appearance in Donald Shebib's Heartaches (1981) was singled out by New York Times critic Vincent Canby: "That very fine actress Peggy Feury appears in a tiny but important scene as the doctor who advises Bonnie about a possible abortion."

By far Feury's most substantial film role (in terms of both sheer size and importance to a film's narrative) came in a little seen low-budget psychological horror film – John Ballard's Friday the 13th: The Orphan (1979), based on the short story Sredni Vashtar by Saki. In Nightmare USA (his 2007 study of lesser-known American exploitation filmmakers), Stephen Thrower writes:

Then there's Peggy Feury, a skilled and thoughtful actress who demonstrates here how she came to be one of the leading lights in her profession. (She taught acting at the Actors Studio, alongside Lee Strasberg.) The role of Aunt Martha is already well-written, but Feury brings her own amazingly subtle shadings to the part.

== Teacher ==
Feury was a charter member of the Actors Studio and frequently led sessions there when Lee Strasberg was unavailable. She also taught her own classes in the same building where Strasberg taught, behind Carnegie Hall.

In December 1968, at Strasberg's suggestion, Feury moved to Los Angeles with her husband William Traylor and their two daughters. After a brief stint teaching at Jack Garfein's Actors and Directors Lab, Feury helped establish the west coast branch of the Lee Strasberg Theatre Institute, where she would double as instructor and artistic director until 1973, when she and Traylor started their own acting school, the Loft Studio, on LaBrea Avenue.

Sean Penn was 18 when he arrived at the Loft; he remained for two years, attending class twenty-five hours a week. Feury's "very gentle," "very personal" approach quickly won over the fiercely independent young actor, as did her emphasis on discovering "how [to] bring yourself to the material rather than the material to you." To Anjelica Huston, who began her studies in 1981 at age 30, Feury was "a revelation," with "a vast knowledge of playwrights" and "an extraordinary gift for making one feel understood." Huston describes her teacher as "beautiful," " quite small and delicate," with a "half way to heaven look." On the other hand, notes Huston, Feury was "extremely intelligent and mordant, Irish, with certain very visceral preferences", and yet had "a way of commenting on a scene that was never destructive. [Even when] you knew she thought it was pretty terrible, she had a way of translating it positively to actors – her process was very reinforcing, I think."

Feury was occasionally called upon to coach an individual actor in a role, as she did Michelle Pfeiffer in Brian De Palma's Scarface (1983) and Lily Tomlin in her one-woman stage show The Search for Signs of Intelligent Life in the Universe. The evolution of Tomlin's show formed the basis of a 1986 documentary in which Feury appeared posthumously; Tomlin dedicated the film to her memory.

From the mid 1970s until her death, Feury and her students frequently showcased the work of playwright Horton Foote, presenting four of his plays in their entirety plus a number of individual scenes from Foote's The Orphans' Home Cycle. In 1984, in her final film role, Feury was cast in the film version of Foote’s 1918, the seventh of The Orphans' Home Cycle's nine plays.

=== Notable students ===
Diane Sherry

- Antero Alli, director
- Richard Dean Anderson
- Ed Begley Jr.
- Sam Behrens
- Hart Bochner
- Ellen Burstyn
- Nicolas Cage
- Dean Cameron
- James Cromwell
- Johnny Depp
- Laura Dern
- Hallie Foote
- Arthur French,
- Melissa Gilbert
- Clarence Gilyard
- Crispin Glover
- Jeff Goldblum
- Lou Gossett Jr.
- John Gulager, filmmaker
- Marilyn Hassett
- Grainger Hines
- Anjelica Huston
- Joanna Kerns
- Callie Khouri, Oscar-winning screenwriter
- Bruno Kirby
- Vonetta McGee
- Michelle Meyrink
- Taylor Miller
- Bobby Moresco, Oscar-winning screenwriter
- Annette O'Toole
- Sachi Parker
- Christopher Penn
- Sean Penn
- Michelle Pfeiffer
- Michelle Phillips
- Meg Ryan
- Albie Selznick
- Robert R. Shafer
- Charlie Sheen
- Eric Stoltz
- Meg Tilly
- Lily Tomlin
- Irene Tsu
- Kate Vernon
- Rosalie Williams
- Daphne Zuniga,
- Milcha Sanchez-Scott, playwright
- Brian Sheehan
- Peter Nelson

== Illness and death ==
Feury struggled with narcolepsy. When she would come out of one of its spells she could be lucid as though she had been alert during the episode. She died Wednesday, November 20, 1985 in a car accident, a head-on collision, in West Los Angeles.

== Stage credits (partial listing) ==
These are acting credits except where otherwise indicated.

Opened	Closed	Title	Writer(s)	Company and/or Venue	Director(s)	Role
Feb 26, 1948	Jul 10, 1948	Me and Molly	Gertrude Berg; Music arr. – Lehman Engel	Belasco Theatre	Ezra Stone	Vera Wertheimer (as Margaret Feury)
Feb 26, 1949	Feb 26, 1949	Cock-a-Doodle-Do	Iris Tree; Music – Ned Rorem	Lenox Hill Playhouse	Margaret Barker	Norah (as Margaret Feury)
Nov 14, 1949	NA	The Closing Door	Alexander Knox	Wilbur Theatre	Lee Strasberg	NA (as Margaret Feury)
Jun 6, 1950	NA	Earth Spirit	Frank Wedekind	Studio 7 Provincetown Playhouse	John Stix	Lulu (as Margaret Feury)
Jan 28, 1951	Feb 24, 1951	Peer Gynt	Henrik Ibsen; Adaptation – Paul Green; Incidental music – Lan Adomian	ANTA Playhouse	Lee Strasberg	Ensemble (as Margaret Feury)
Mar 13, 1952	NA	The Grass Harp	Truman Capote; Music – Virgil Thomson	Colonial Theatre	Robert Lewis	Choir Mistress (as Margaret Feury)
May 28, 1952	June 8, 1952	Sunday Breakfast	Emilio Rubio and Miriam Balf	Coronet Theatre	Stella Adler	Martha Decker (as Margaret Feury)
Aug 23, 1953	Aug 28, 1953	Make Momma Happy	George Baxt	Laketside Theatre (in Lake Hopatcong Landing)	NA	Norma Talmadge Greenwald (as Margaret Feury)
Nov 18, 1953	Nov 22, 1953	Make Momma Happy	George Baxt	Parsons Theatre (in Hartford, CT)	NA	Norma Talmadge Greenwald (as Margaret Feury)
Nov 24, 1953	Dec 6, 1953	Make Momma Happy	George Baxt	Walnut Street Theatre	NA	Norma Talmadge Greenwald (as Margaret Feury)
Summer 1954	Summer 1954 (Five performances)	A Hatful of Rain	Michael V. Gazzo	The Actors Studio	Frank Corsaro	Putski
Jun 19, 1955	NA	Three Players of a Summer Game	Tennessee Williams	White Barn Theatre	Henry Hewes	NA (as Peg Feury)
May 21, 1956	NA	The Man With the Golden Arm	Jack Kirkland	Cherry Lane Theatre	Louis MacMillan	Zosh
July 8, 1957	NA	Volpone	Ben Jonson; Stefan Zweig – Adaptation	Boston Summer Theater; New England Mutual Hall	Gene Frankel	Canina
Mar 17, 1958	Mar 29, 1958	Picnic	William Inge	Coconut Grove Playhouse	Albert Lipton	NA
Apr 20, 1959	NA	The Innocents	William Archibald; Henry James – Novel; Alex North – Music	Gramercy Arts Theatre	Harvey Cort	Miss Giddens
Aug 30, 1961	Sep 11, 1961	Sweet Bird of Youth	Tennessee Williams	Gateway Playhouse	David Sheldon	Alexandra Del Lago, the Princess Kosmonopolis (as Peg Feury)
Mar 20, 1963	Mar 30, 1963	The Lady of the Camellias	Giles Cooper; Adaptation – Terrence McNally; Novel – Alexandre Dumas, fils Music – Ned Rorem	Winter Garden Theater	Franco Zeffirelli	Jeanne
Jun 13, 1963	NA	Antony and Cleopatra	William Shakespeare; Music – David Amram	New York Shakespeare Festival; Delacorte Theatre	Joseph Papp	Octavia
Jun 22, 1964	Oct 3, 1964	The Three Sisters	Anton Chekhov; Randall Jarrell – English version	The Actors Studio Theatre; Morosco Theatre	Lee Strasberg	Olga (Replacement for Geraldine Page)
May 17, 1967	Jul 16, 1967	Drums in the Night	Bertolt Brecht; Translation – Frank Jones	Circle in the Square Downtown	Theodore Mann	Emily Balicke
Apr 24, 1968	Apr 27, 1968	The Exercise	Lewis John Carlino	John Golden Theatre	Alfred Ryder	The Actress (Standby for Anne Jackson)
Jan 25, 1974	Jan 27, 1974	La boheme	Libretto - Luigi Illica and Giuseppe Giacosa; Music – Giacomo Puccini	Lyric Opera Assn. of Orange County; Forum Theater	Peggy Feury	Directed by
1975 or 1976	NA	Old Man	Horton Foote – adaptation William Faulkner – Story	Loft Studio Theatre (in Los Angeles)	Peggy Feury	Directed by
Jun __, 1980	Jul 6, 1980	Totem Pole (World Premiere)	Paul Smith	Los Angeles Actors' Theater	Gennaro Montanino	Mrs. Goss
___ __, 1981	NA	The Man Who Climbed the Pecan Trees (World Premiere)	Horton Foote	Loft Studio Theatre (in Los Angeles, CA)	William Traylor	Mrs. Campbell
___ __, 1981	NA	Blind Date (World Premiere)	Horton Foote	Loft Studio Theatre (in Los Angeles, CA)	Peggy Feury	Directed by
Apr 13, 1984	NA	Cousins (World Premiere)	Horton Foote	Loft Studio (in Los Angeles, CA)	William Traylor; Peggy Feury	Corella Davenport (and Directed by)
