= House of Glass (radio program) =

American old-time radio serial drama

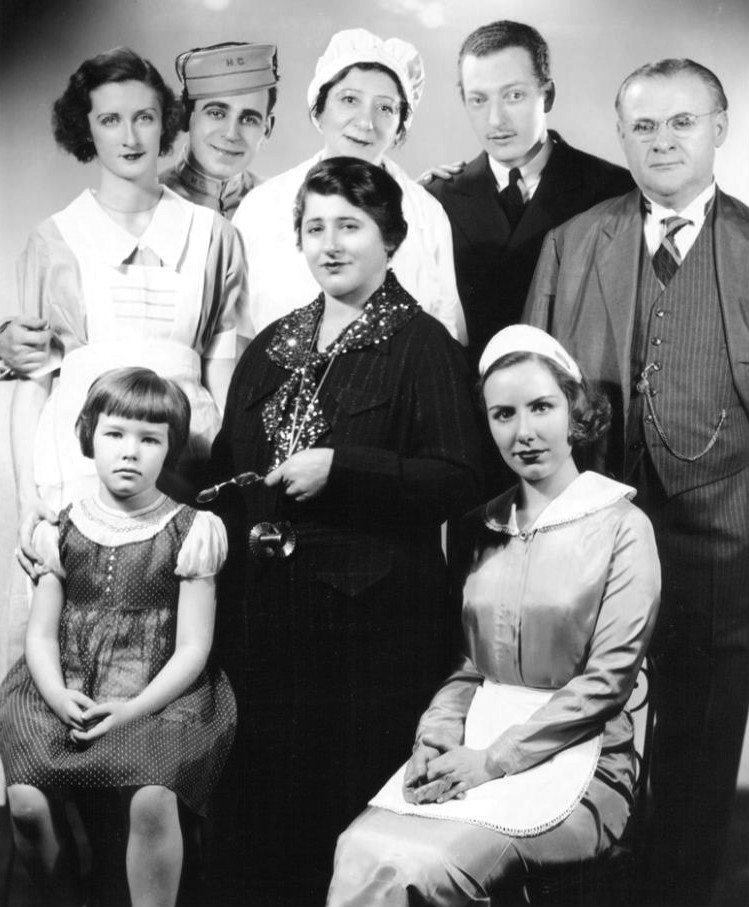
- Publicity photo of the cast of The House of Glass. Cast: standing, rear-Arline Blackburn, Paul Stewart, Bertha Walden, Everett Sloane, Joseph Greenwald. Center-Gertrude Berg. Seated-Celia Babcock, Helene Dumas.
- Country of origin: United States
- Language(s): English
- Starring: Gertrude Berg and Joseph Greenwald (1935); Berg and Josef Buloff (1953–1954)
- Created by: Gertrude Berg
- Written by: Gertrude Berg
- Directed by: Gertrude Berg
- Produced by: Gertrude Berg
- Original release: April 17, 1935 – March 12, 1954

House of Glass is an American old-time radio serial drama. It was broadcast on the Blue Network from April 17, 1935, until December 25, 1935, and revived on NBC from October 23, 1953, until March 12, 1954.

== 1935 version ==
=== Background ===
Gertrude Berg created House of Glass soon after her previous show, The Goldbergs, was canceled by NBC. Berg had two objectives with House of Glass — "to show Pepsodent [the former show's sponsor] that she could survive without their money" and "to distance herself from Molly Goldberg.

=== Format ===
House of Glass centered around Bessie Glass, a Jewish owner of a hotel, and a variety of eccentric guests who stayed there. A preview newspaper article described Glass as "a shrewish, blustering termigant". The show's introduction invited listeners to enjoy "Bessie Glass and Barney, and the day by day human stories of their little hotel."

Berg's father operated a resort hotel in the Catskill Mountains, which gave her the background for recurring characters in House of Glass -- particularly the head waiter, the bellboy, and the dish washer. She kept the program's characters realistic by frequently mingling with people in Jewish neighborhoods, as she had done for The Goldbergs. Her primary methods of doing so were shopping and chatting with residents on the Lower East Side of New York City and attending meetings of a women's club in that neighborhood. She used a pseudonym and changed her accent so that people would not recognize her.

=== Personnel ===
Berg had four roles — star, producer, director, and writer — with House of Glass Characters and the actors who portrayed them are shown in the table below.

| Character | Actor |
|---|---|
| Bessie Glass | Gertrude Berg |
| Barney Glass | Joseph Greenwald |
| Millie | Arline Blackburn |
| Ella | Helene Dumas |
| Tiny | Celia Babcock |

The supporting cast included Bertha Walden, Paul Stewart, and Everett Sloane. Billy Artzt and his orchestra provided music.

=== Demise ===
Just as the end of The Goldbergs led to creation of House of Glass, the latter program ended when the former was revived. In 1936, Colgate-Palmolive took on sponsorship of The Goldbergs, leading to a five-year contract worth $1 million to Berg.

== 1953–1954 version ==
In 1953, NBC brought House of Glass back to radio soon after the televised version of The Goldbergs went off the air. In this version, Berg played Sophie, a cook, who was secretly engaged to the hotel's proprietor, Mr. Glass. The cast and actors are shown in the table below.

| Character | Actor |
|---|---|
| Sophie Milner | Gertrude Berg |
| Barney Glass | Josef Buloff |
| Dish washer | Harold Stone |
| Waitress | Ann Thomas |

The producer was Cherney Berg, son of Gertrude Berg. Gertrude Berg wrote the scripts in longhand, and her husband typed them for the program.

== Television ==
Berg created an original sketch of House of Glass and performed it on NBC's "first official television broadcast" in 1940.
