= Natalia Landauer =

Natalia Landauer may refer to:

- Natalia Lanauer, character in I Am A Camera, played by Marian Winters
- Natalia Landauer, a character in the 1972 film Cabaret played by Marisa Berenson
