= Joseph Greenwald (actor) =

American actor (c.1878–1938)

Joseph Greenwald (circa 1878 – April 1, 1938) was an American actor who died on stage after having a heart attack.

== Early years ==
A native of New York's lower East Side, Greenwald dropped out of school at age 10 and began selling newspapers in front of the Thalia Theater. Over time, he became familiar to the theater's staff, leading to his initial involvement with the theater when the stage manager asked Greenwald if he would like to replace a fired call boy. Watching the actors, especially Morris Moscovitch, stirred his desire to become an actor.

== Career ==
Greenwald's first venture as a performer ended with his employer telling him that he was no good and refusing to pay him. Undeterred, Greenwald joined a repertory theatre company at a salary of $25 per week, part of which went to buy his costumes and wigs. He played 38 parts (all characters 50 or older) in 44 weeks. From there, he went into vaudeville.

He eventually progressed from five-times-a-day performances in vaudeville to portraying Solomon Levy in a touring company of Abie's Irish Rose. After that play was performed in London as part of a two-year tour by an English troupe, the Fellowship of Players there requested him to play Shylock in a special presentation of The Merchant of Venice, and he received acclaim from critics for that role.

Greenwald's Broadway credits include The Camels Are Coming (1931), Bulls, Bears and Asses (1932), Keeping Expenses Down (1932), The Great Magoo (1932), Anybody's Game (1932), Spring Song (1934), The Eldest (1935), The Postman Always Rings Twice (1936), Forbidden Melody (1936), But For the Grace of God (1937), and Hitch Your Wagon (1937). Greenwald's role of Greek restaurateur Nick Papadakis in The Postman Always Rings Twice initially presented a problem as he sought to find someone whose Greek accent he could imitate. After several unsuccessful efforts, he heard a fur dyer in the shop of his wife's furrier. After they had a couple of dinners and spent three or four evenings together, Greenwald had the accent that he needed.

On old-time radio, Greenwald portrayed the husband of Gertrude Berg's character in House of Glass.

== Death ==
On April 1, 1938, Greenwald suffered a heart attack while portraying Joe Bonaparte in a production of Golden Boy in Santa Barbara, California. Only when cast members shouted for curtains to be drawn did the audience realize that his collapse was not part of the play. The pulmotor squad of the Santa Barbara Fire Department responded but was unable to revive him, and the audience was dismissed.
