= Valentin de Vargas =

American actor

- Valentin de Vargas in Death Valley Days, 1965
- Born: Albert Charles Schubert; April 27, 1935; Albuquerque, New Mexico, U.S.
- Died: June 10, 2013 (aged 78); Tulsa, Oklahoma, U.S.
- Occupation: Actor
- Years active: 1955–2011
- Spouse(s): Arlene McQuade (m. 1960; div. 1967) Nome Jones (m. 1973; div. 1980) M. Diana Pace (m. 2007)
- Children: 3

Valentin de Vargas (born Albert Charles Schubert; April 27, 1935 – June 10, 2013) was an American actor known for appearing in films in the 1950s and 1960s. Two of his prominent roles were as a gangster threatening Janet Leigh in Orson Welles' Touch of Evil (1958) and playing Luis Francisco Garcia Lopez in Hatari! (1962).

== Biography ==
After serving in the United States Army, de Vargas made his film debut in The Blackboard Jungle while still attending Loyola Marymount University. He had responded to a flyer posted at Loyola to audition for a high school student role in the film. He had a variety of uncredited appearances in films and appeared in several television series until Touch of Evil in 1958, where he also met his first wife, actress Arlene McQuade. He travelled to Mexico, where he played one of the Mexican bandidos in The Magnificent Seven (1960).

In the 1960s he appeared on television programs including Bonanza, Daniel Boone, The Wild Wild West, That Girl S3, E2, Gunsmoke, Death Valley Days, The High Chaparral, Mission: Impossible, Barnaby Jones, The Streets of San Francisco, and Dallas. He later operated a realty firm, Schubert-DeVargas Realty, in Santa Fe, New Mexico. In 1962 he joined the cast of international stars in Howard Hawks' Hatari!.

== Death ==
After suffering for many months from myelodysplastic syndrome, he died on June 10, 2013, aged 78, in Tulsa, Oklahoma. His interment was at Santa Fe National Cemetery.

His first wife was actress Arlene McQuade, who died in 2014. He was a nephew of actor Don Alvarado.

== Partial filmography ==
- Blackboard Jungle (1955) - Latino Student (uncredited)
- The Girl He Left Behind (1956) - Diaz (uncredited)
- The Big Caper (1957) - Gas Station Attendant (uncredited)
- Ten Thousand Bedrooms (1957) - Reporter (uncredited)
- Tip on a Dead Jockey (1957) - Spanish Official (uncredited)
- The Girl Most Likely (1958) - Young Daddy (uncredited)
- Touch of Evil (1958) - Pancho
- Broken Arrow, "Manhunt" (1958) - Miguel
- The Magnificent Seven (1960) - Santos, Calvera Henchman (uncredited)
- The Nun and the Sergeant (1962) - Rivas
- Hatari! (1962) - Luis Francisco Garcia Lopez
- The Firebrand (1962) - Joaquin Murieta
- Hellfighters (1968) - Amal Bokru
- Incident on a Dark Street (1973) - Ernesto De La Pina
- The Bears and I (1974) - Sam Eagle Speaker
- Treasure of Matecumbe (1976) - Charlie
- Fast Forward (1985) - M.C
- To Live and Die in L.A. (1985) - Judge Filo Cedillo
- Exiled in America (1992) - Rene Castillo
- This World, Then the Fireworks (1997) - Mexican Doctor (final film role)
