= Joan Lazer =

American actress (1936 or 1937 – 2015)

Joan Lazer (1936 or 1937 – January 3, 2015) was an American child actress who worked primarily in radio. Although she performed on stage and on film, she said that she learned more in radio "and besides it's more exciting to do a different show every week than the same one every night."

== Early years ==
Lazer was born in Tel Aviv and moved to New York when she was 2 years old. She began taking lessons in a singing and dancing school in Forest Hills, Long Island, New York, when she was 5. Her appearance at age 6 on the children's radio program Coast to Coast on a Bus led to her desire to be a professional entertainer. Although that appearance was scheduled to be her only time on the show, she ended up singing on it once a week for two years.

Lazer studied at the Professional Children's School and the Lodge Professional School. She also had a music teacher for lessons in piano and voice. She went on to study at Actors Studio, Columbia University, and New York University.

== Career ==
After being trained on how to read scripts, Lazer began auditioning for parts in dramatic radio programs. Her first audition led to a part on My True Story, and parts on other programs followed. During her first 18 months in radio she appeared on programs more than 300 times. Her roles on network radio series included Jess on Rosemary, Pixie Jeffreys on Valiant Lady, and Jill on Young Doctor Malone. In 1946, she and Richard Leone (ages 9 and 11, respectively) had a program, Milk and Cookies with Jack and Jill, on WNEW Radio in New York City. They discussed world events from a children's perspective for 15 minutes on Sundays. In 1947 she made a set of four recordings that were used by the National Safety Council to promote safety for children. The Mother Goose-themed jingles, initially recorded for WNEW, were made available for use by radio stations and schools.

Lazer made recordings for children, including "Puss In Boots" and "Who's Who at the Zoo". On the latter recording, Lazer "carries the narrative assignment, taking her moppet listeners on a tour of a large and thriving zoo filled with erudite animals who give brief musical lessons in natural history." She was part of a stock company created by Tone Products Corporation to make recordings for children, and she recorded "Come to the Fair" for the Children's Record Guild.

On Broadway Lazer portrayed Rosie Goldberg in Me and Molly (1948). On film, she portrayed "a child of the slums" in Undercover Man (1948), a role that required her to learn some of her lines in Italian. A review of that film in the Oakland Tribune said of Lazer, "Called upon to play a little Italian girl, daughter of one of the syndicate's men, she is as natural as any youngster now playing on your street. In the scene where she interprets for her aged grandmother and urges Ford to go on with his job instead of seeking peace and security on a farm, she is little short of magnificent."

Television programs on which Lazer appeared included The Further Adventures of Ellery Queen, American Inventory, Treasury Men in Action, and Stage 13.

== Personal life and death ==
Lazer died on January 3, 2015, after having cancer for seven years.
