= Elizabeth Parrish =

American actress and singer (1925–2022)

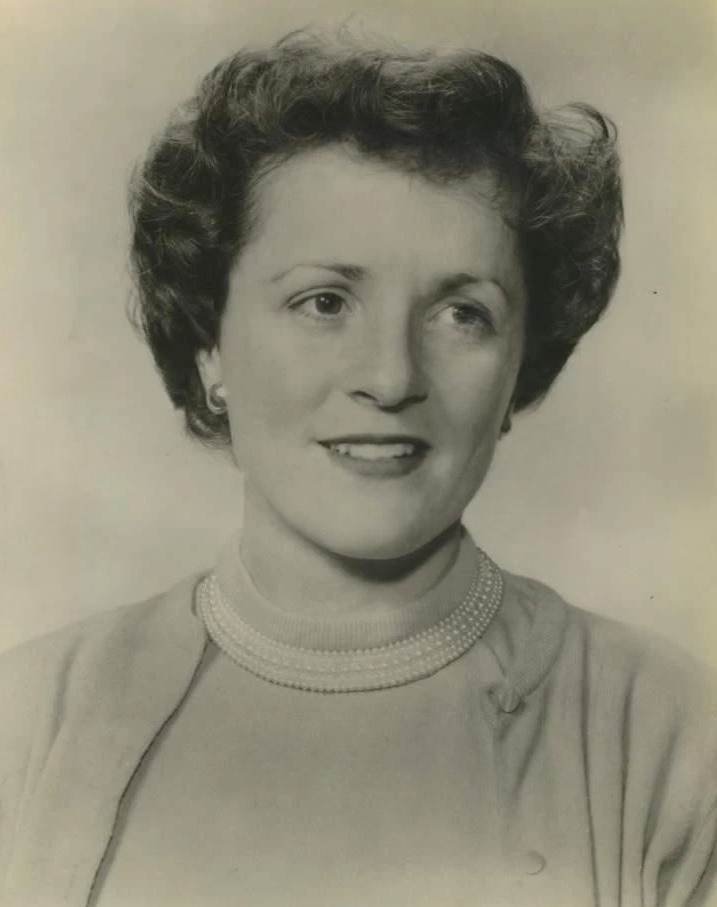
- Born: 10 February 1925; Manhattan, New York, U.S.
- Died: 16 December 2022 (aged 97); Manhattan, New York, U.S.
- Occupation: Actress
- Years active: 1956-2022

Elizabeth "Betsy" Parrish (February 10, 1925 – December 16, 2022) was an American actress, singer and acting teacher.

== Career ==
Parrish was long affiliated with the Stella Adler Studio of Acting. Other teaching credits include: Circle in the Square, High School of Performing Arts, Metropolitan Opera Studio, Yale Drama School (Associate Professor Adjunct), American Academy of Dramatic Art, and the Eugene O'Neill International Theatre Institute. She was a founding member of the Harold Clurman Laboratory Theatre Company, having performed in Uncle Vanya, Hot L Baltimore, and Macbeth.

In 2004, she appeared in a one-woman New York musical revue, Moments of Being, with Betsy. In 2013, aged 88, she teamed up with Canadian dancer and choreographer Margie Gillis to create a piece based on the poems of Emily Dickinson called Bulletins from Immortality, directed by Paola Styron, which they performed nationally and internationally.

In 2019 and 2020, the nonagenarian Parrish performed her cabaret show, "Every Soul's a Cabaret", at, among other venues, the Martha's Vineyard Playhouse (Massachusetts) and Pangea (NYC), with collaborator and musical director Mark Fifer.

=== Acting credits ===
==== Broadway & Off-Broadway ====
- La Cage aux Folles, as Jacqueline (1983 thru 1987)
- Deathtrap as Helga ten Dorp; succeeded Marian Winters (1978 thru 1982)
- Keep It In the Family, as standby for roles of Betsy Jane and Daisy Brady
- Pickwick, as Mrs. Leo Hunter and as understudy for role of Rachel (1965)
- Riverwind as Louise Sumner (1962)
- Little Mary Sunshine as Mme. Ernestine von Liebedich (1959)
- Johnny Johnson as French Nurse (1956)

==== Feature films ====
- See You in the Morning (1989) as "Group Therapy Patient"
- Orphans (1987) as "Rich Woman"

==== Television ====
- Law & Order (1994) as "Judge Sally Norton"
- Kate & Allie (1989) as "Evelyn"
- The Edge of Night (soap opera) as "Zelda Moffett" (1981) and as "Buffy Revere" (1982)
