= Dale Ricardo Shields =

American actor

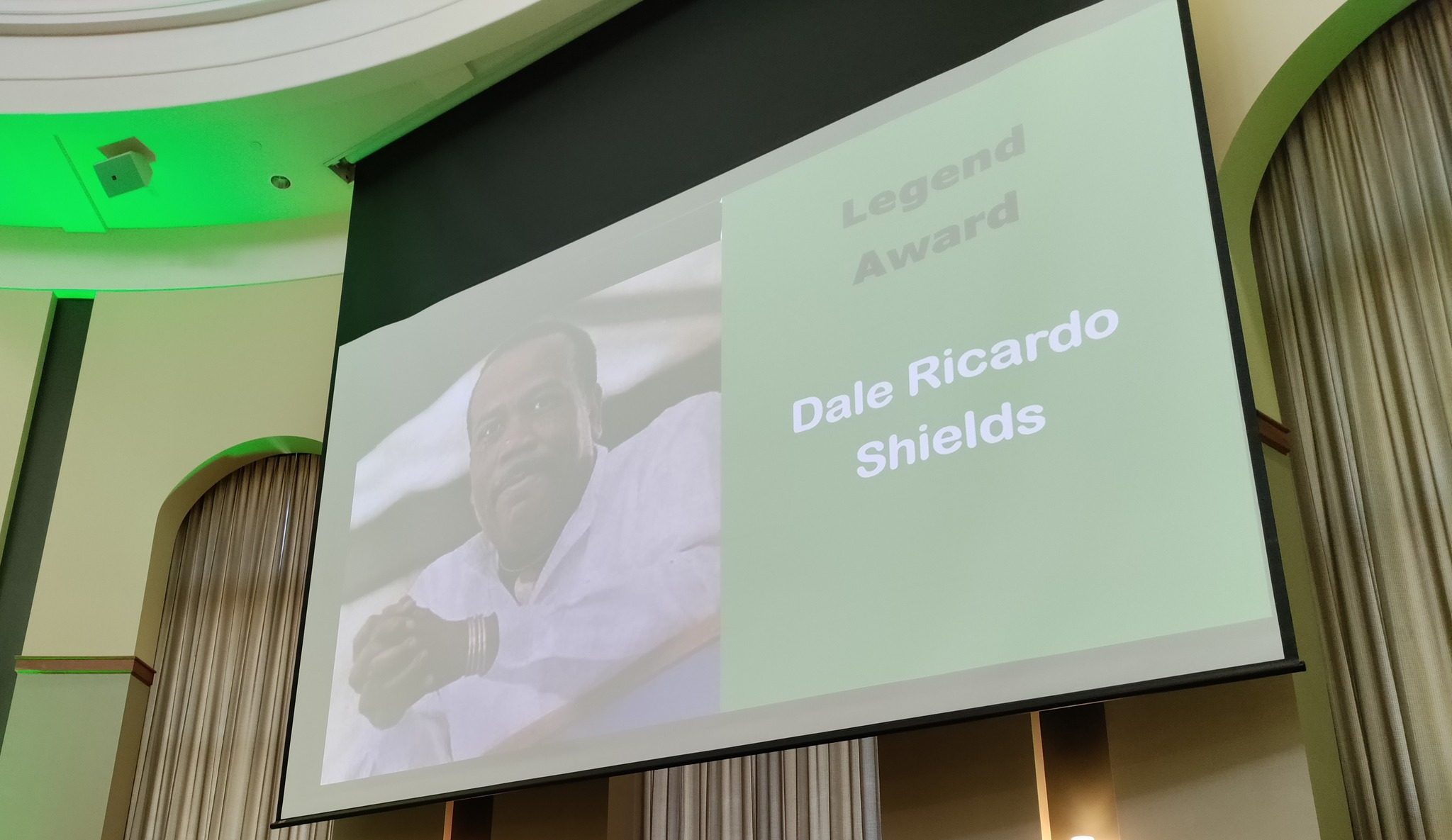
- Dale Ricardo Shields, Ohio University - LEGEND AWARD 2022
- Born: Dale Ricardo Shields; November 4, 1952 (age 73); Cleveland, Ohio, United States
- Education: Ohio University (BFA); Ohio University (MFA)
- Occupations: Actor; Artistic Activist; Director; Producer; Educator

Dale Ricardo Shields is an African American actor, director, producer, and educator. He is one of ten teachers nationwide who received the 2017 The Kennedy Center/Stephen Sondheim Inspirational Teacher Award.

Dale also received the 2017 AUDELCO / "VIV" Special Achievement Award. In September, 2022, Shields received the Ebony Bobcat Network (EBN) Legend Award from Ohio University.

Shields was named the recipient of the 2021 Paul Robeson Award by the Actors’ Equity Association and the Actors’ Equity Foundation.

In 2020, 2021, 2022 and 2023, Dale received the Actors Fund / Encore Award.

== Early life ==
Shields is the youngest of two sons of Claude Lee and Fannie Lousie Shields. His grandfather and father were founding members of the Shields Brother Gospel Quartet of Ohio and his mother was a member of the Turner Gospel Singers directed by the gospel artist, Arthur Turner. Don King is Shields' cousin. King's mother and Shields' grandmother were sisters.

Dale graduated from John F. Kennedy High School in 1970 and holds BFA (1975) and MFA (1995) degrees from Ohio University.

== Career ==
Shields' professional credits as a director, stage manager, and actor (Broadway, Off-Broadway, Off-Off-Broadway, and Regional) include projects and assignments at Lincoln Center (State Theatre), The Henry Street Settlement House (New Federal Theatre), The Negro Ensemble Company, The Joseph Papp Public Theatre (New York Shakespeare Festival) and Karamu House. Shields is on the board of directors of AUDELCO.

Shields studied Acting at The Negro Ensemble Company and The Henry Street Settlement House with Harold Scott (director) and Dick Anthony Williams in New York City.

Shields was the assistant to Lloyd Richards and Assistant Director for the New Federal Theatre premiere production of Ossie Davis' play A Last Dance With Sybil starring Ruby Dee and Earl Hyman. His TV acting credits include The Cosby Show, Another World, Guiding Light, Saturday Night Live, and the ITV television series Special Needs. In 2001, Shields directed and choreographed a production of the Ntozake Shange play For Colored Girls Who Have Considered Suicide / When the Rainbow Is Enuf which featured the young Danai Gurira, then a senior at Macalester College. In 2015, Shields directed the staged reading of HOME by Samm-Art Williams at the Karamu House Jelliffe Theatre. The production featured James Pickens, Jr., Nina Domingue and Mariama Whyte.

Shields appeared as Martin in the New York City revival of Stephen Sondheim's Any One Can Whistle at the York Theatre Company, directed by Fran Soeder and in the Lincoln Center world premiere of Lily based on Saul Bellow's Henderson the Rain King. directed by Tom O' Horgan at Lincoln Center (State Theatre). Shields has also appeared in various commercials and film.

For theatrical director/producer Joseph Papp, he conducted workshops at The Public Theater (New York Shakespeare Festival) with the Playwriting in the Schools Program (PITS) for six seasons.

During his six-year teaching tenure at The Public Theater, he represented the United States of America at the ASSITEJ Theatre Festival in London, England in 1988. He is the Project1VOICE Liaison for the state of Ohio.

In recognition of his outstanding career, Shields received the Special Achievement Award at the 45th Annual Vivian Robinson AUDELCO Recognition Awards event in 2017. In 2020, 2021, 2022 and 2023, Dale received the Actors Fund / Encore Award.

== Educator ==
As a University Professor, Shields has received two Outstanding Professor Awards and three Educational Program of the Year awards. In 2015, Shields was nominated for the inaugural "Excellence in Theatre Education Award". This award is a collaboration between the Tony Award and Carnegie Mellon University. The award recognizes a K-12 theatre educator "who has demonstrated monumental impact on the lives of students and who embodies the highest standards of the profession."

Shields has taught at Ohio University, The College of Wooster, Denison University, Macalester College, Susquehanna University artist-in-residence and SUNY Potsdam.

He is a Professor of Acting, Directing, Black Theatre, Black Studies and Stage Management.

Shields is the creator of the Black History website Iforcolor.org.
