= Independent Shakespeare Co. =

Los Angeles-based theatre company

Independent Shakespeare Co. (commonly known as Indie Shakes or ISC) is a nonprofit theatre company, based in Los Angeles. They most frequently stage theatrical productions of the works of William Shakespeare and other Elizabethan and Jacobean classics during their Griffith Park Free Shakespeare Festival in the summers. The Shakespeare Festival performs in the Old L.A. Zoo, also known as the Griffith Park Zoo.

Additionally, Indie Shakes produces modern classics and develops new devised, musical, and solo works year-round in their Studio theater space in Atwater Village, Los Angeles.

The company is responsible for the Griffith Park Free Shakespeare Festival, which draws audiences of roughly 50,000 Angelenos in an average summer and is one of the most attended and notable Shakespeare in the Park Festivals in the United States.

== Founding and company history ==
David Melville and Melissa Chalsma met as ensemble members in the 1995 Tony Award winning Broadway production of Hamlet starring Ralph Fiennes. This production, directed by Jonathan Kent, had transferred from the Almeida Theatre in London.

After marrying and settling in New York City, they founded their own Shakespeare company in 1998.

ISC's first 1999 production of Henry V cost $800 to produce and took place at 10pm in a small theatre, following another ensemble's production of Pigoletto; Rigoletto with a pig.

Chalsma and Melville relocated to Los Angeles in June 2001 and the following year they began performing in various venues throughout the city, finally finding a home at Barnsdall Art Park in 2004. Their first audience was just 20 people, but their patronage grew to 300 the following year and increased every subsequent year until they outgrew Barnsdall and moved to Griffith Park, in 2010, where they began to accommodate audiences of over 1,000.

In 2015, the Department of Recreation and Parks moved forward with building plans for the permanent stage at the Old Zoo site championed by Councilmember Tom LaBonge which has yet to be completed.

ISC weathered the COVID-19 pandemic by increasing remote and cinematic offerings. They also shifted their Griffith Park location further up the hill and limited their audience capacity for the summer festivals in 2021 and 2022. They returned to their primary location in 2023.

== Production history and venues ==
Independent Shakespeare Co.'s early years were marked by transition between New York and Los Angeles.

Following their first summer in Barnsdall Art Park, ISC toured their production of Richard III in France as part of the 100th anniversary of the Entente Cordiale in October 2004.

=== Free Shakespeare in Barnsdall Art Park ===
With support from the city's Department of Cultural Affairs, ISC established a residency in Barnsdall in 2004 with their first production The Two Gentlemen of Verona. During this time they ran up to three productions in repertory.

During this formative time for the company they performed for small audiences that were often interrupted by soccer games, helicopter traffic, and various forms of noise pollution.

=== Griffith Park Free Shakespeare Festival ===
Having outgrown Barnsdall, the company moved to Griffith Park near the site of the Old Los Angeles Zoo on the park's east side in 2010, which enabled the company to accommodate bigger crowds. They began with average audiences of 700 people per performance; significantly more than Barnsdall's approved capacity of just 485. Audiences currently range from 1,000 to 3,000 Angelenos. ISC produces an average of two works in Griffith Park that run in repertory or separately.

=== ISC Studio ===
In 2011, the company secured a dedicated indoor space for programming, rehearsals, and classes near Griffith Park in Atwater Village. The ISC Studio offers programming year round that tends to be devised, musical, and solo works born of their ensemble in early development or more experimental explorations of classics. The Studio also hosts Shakespearean acting classes and their Iambic Lab.

== Notable personalities ==
The ISC Advisory Council includes Ralph Fiennes, Jonathan Kent, Paul McCrane, John C. Reilly, and Bradley Whitford.

Elizabeth Dennehy has performed with the company and served on its board of directors.

Actors Kelly AuCoin and Angel Parker have performed with the company.

== Cultural references ==
ISC's 2017 production of Measure for Measure was referenced in the Arden Shakespeare's Third Edition of the scholarly play text:

Melissa Chalsma's 2017 Independent Shakespeare Company Production had Isabella (Kalean Ung) and the Duke (David Melville) touching each other in affectionate alliance several times before drawing back, startled at themselves, each time; after only a momentary stone-faced pause for Isabella after the Duke's second proposal, she leaped delightedly into his embrace, and a happy dance began.

— A. R. Braunmuller, Robert N. Watson

Christopher Munch's 2011 film Letters from the Big Man features a scene from the company's 2009 production of The Tempest with actors David Melville, Phil Briggs, and Bobby Plascencia.

Shakespeare in Griffith Park is referenced in H.D. Knightley's Bestselling YA novel Sid and Teddy.

== Accolades ==
In 2018, ISC received the Paul Robeson Citation Award from the Actors' Equity Foundation and Actors’ Equity Association.

In 2009, ISC received the Charlie Award from the Hollywood Arts Council for Excellence in Theater Arts.

They received the 2014 LA Drama Critics Circle Margaret Harford Award for Sustained Excellence in Theater.

Kalean Ung received an award for excellence in a Lead Performance at the 2023 Stage Raw Theater Awards for her portrayal of Lady Macbeth.

Founder and Artistic Director Melissa Chalsma was recognized by Senator Anthony Portantino as a 2023 Women in Business Honoree.
