= The Firebrand (1962 film) =

1962 film by Maury Dexter

- Directed by: Maury Dexter
- Screenplay by: Harry Spalding
- Produced by: Maury Dexter
- Starring: Kent Taylor; Valentin de Vargas; Lisa Montell
- Cinematography: Floyd Crosby
- Edited by: Jodie Copelan
- Music by: Richard LaSalle
- Production company: Associated Producers Inc
- Distributed by: 20th Century Fox
- Release date: August 7, 1962
- Running time: 61 minutes
- Country: United States
- Language: English

The Firebrand (also known as Caballero) is a 1962 American Western film directed and produced by Maury Dexter and starring Kent Taylor, Valentin de Vargas and Lisa Montell.

== Plot ==
A Mexican outlaw wages a war against the corrupt California Rangers during the California Gold Rush.

== Cast ==
- Kent Taylor as Maj. Tim Bancroft
- Valentin de Vargas as Joaquin Murieta
- Lisa Montell as Clarita Vasconcelos
- Joe Raciti as Jack Garcia
- Chubby Johnson as Tampico
- Barbara Mansell as Cassie
- Allen Jaffe as Torres
- Troy Melton as Walker
- Fred Krone as Dickens
- Sid Haig as Diego
- Felix Locher as Ramirez
- Jerry Summers as Rafael Vasconcelos
- Tom Daly as California Ranger
- I. Stanford Jolley as California Ranger
- Pat Lawless as California Ranger
