= Art D'Lugoff =

Art D'Lugoff (August 2, 1924 - November 4, 2009) in Brooklyn, New York, was an American jazz impresario. He opened The Village Gate, a jazz club in New York City's Greenwich Village, in 1958. D'Lugoff sought out the hottest talent, hosting prominent jazz artists, including Billie Holiday, Duke Ellington, Dizzy Gillespie, Aretha Franklin, and Miles Davis, as well as the best in comedy, including Bill Cosby, Mort Sahl, Woody Allen, and John Belushi.

D'Lugoff turned away Bob Dylan, prompting the latter to write music in the basement of the club. He also fired a Dustin Hoffman for providing poor table service. Playwright Sam Shepard once bused tables.

D'Lugoff styled himself on the famous showman Sol Hurok. His avant-garde programming also set the stage for theatrical nudity in New York - the 1974 musical review Let My People Come featured a fully nude co-ed cast.

Financial reverses led D'Lugoff to declare bankruptcy in 1991. He closed the club in 1994. In the wake of The Village Gate's closing, D'Lugoff dreamed of opening a new jazz club near Times Square. He worked on raising money for the development of a national jazz museum and hall of fame to be located in New York City. D'Lugoff's idea of a museum eventually developed into the National Jazz Museum of Harlem.

D'Lugoff won the Paul Robeson Award in 1992.

In 2008 the Village Gate re-opened under the name "Le Poisson Rouge", with D'Lugoff as a consultant.

On November 4, 2009, after complaining of a shortness of breath, he was taken to New York-Presbyterian Hospital where he died at the age of 85. On November 7, 2009, citing an unnamed source, the New York Post claimed that at the time of his death, D'Lugoff was weeks away from re-launching his nightclub at an even bigger downtown venue.

D'Lugoff's wife, Avital D'Lugoff, worked as a photographer; she died on March 29, 2010. The couple had four children: Sharon, Dahlia, Rachel, and jazz pianist Raphael.
