= The 49th Cousin =

- Original language: English
- Written by: Florence Lowe; Caroline Francke

Premiere
- Date: 27 October 1960
- Place: Broadway at the Ambassador Theatre

The 49th Cousin is a play by Florence Lowe and Caroline Francke. The work premiered on Broadway at the Ambassador Theatre on 27 October 1960 and closed after 102 performances on January 21, 1961.

The production was directed by Jack Smight and starred Menasha Skulnik as Issac Lowe, Marian Winters as Tracy Lowe, Martha Scott as Fanny Lowe, Evans Evans as Carrie Lowe, Eli Mintz as Simon Lowe, Gerald Hiken as Moishe (Morris) Golub, John Boruff as Rabbi Ansbacher, David Kurlan as Mr. Kronfeld, Alfred Leberfeld as Mr. Miller, and Paul Tripp as Mr. Cronyn.
