= Paul Robeson Award =

Award bestowed by the Actors' Equity Association

The Paul Robeson Award is the only award bestowed by both the Actors' Equity Association and the Actors' Equity Foundation. The winner is selected by the Paul Robeson Citation Award Committee.

The award was established by the Paul Robeson Committee on June 1, 1971. Frederick O'Neal was appointed Chair. The award is presented to "an individual or organization that best leverages theatre to go beyond the stage to enact their commitment to the freedom of expression and conscience, their belief in the artist’s responsibility to society and their dedication to the betterment of humankind."

== Recipients ==
- 1974: Paul Robeson
- 1975: Ossie Davis & Ruby Dee
- 1976: Lillian Hellman
- 1977: Pete Seeger
- 1978: Sam Jaffe
- 1979: Harry Belafonte
- 1980: Alice Childress
- 1981: Studs Terkel
- 1982: Ed Asner
- 1983: John Henry Faulk
- 1984: Lena Horne
- 1985: Arthur Mitchell
- 1986: Vinie Burrows
- 1987: Joe Papp
- 1988: Jacques d'Amboise
- 1989: Bill Ross & Dr. Margaret Burroughs
- 1990: Maya Angelou
- 1991: Gordon Parks
- 1992: Art D'Lugoff
- 1993: Katherine Dunham
- 1994: Lloyd Richards
- 1995: Gil Noble
- 1996: George C. Wolfe
- 1997: Athol Fugard
- 1998: Leonard de Paul
- 1999: Loften Mitchell
- 2000: Rosetta LeNoire
- 2001: Brock Peters
- 2002: Gertrude Jeannette
- 2003: Woodie King Jr.
- 2004: Judith Jamison
- 2005: Carl Harms
- 2006: Bill Cosby rescinded
- 2007: Mercedes Ellington
- 2008: Sidney Poitier
- 2009: Micki Grant
- 2010: Charles Randolph-Wright
- 2011: James Earl Jones
- 2012: William Greaves
- 2014: Baayork Lee
- 2015: Arthur French
- 2016: Mary-Mitchell Campbell
- 2017: Jamal Joseph
- 2018: Independent Shakespeare Co.
- 2019-20: Carmen Morgan and Furaba Shioda
- 2021: Dale Ricardo Shields
- 2022: Pearl Cleage
- 2023: The Black Repertory Theatre of Kansas City
