= Arlene McQuade =

American actress

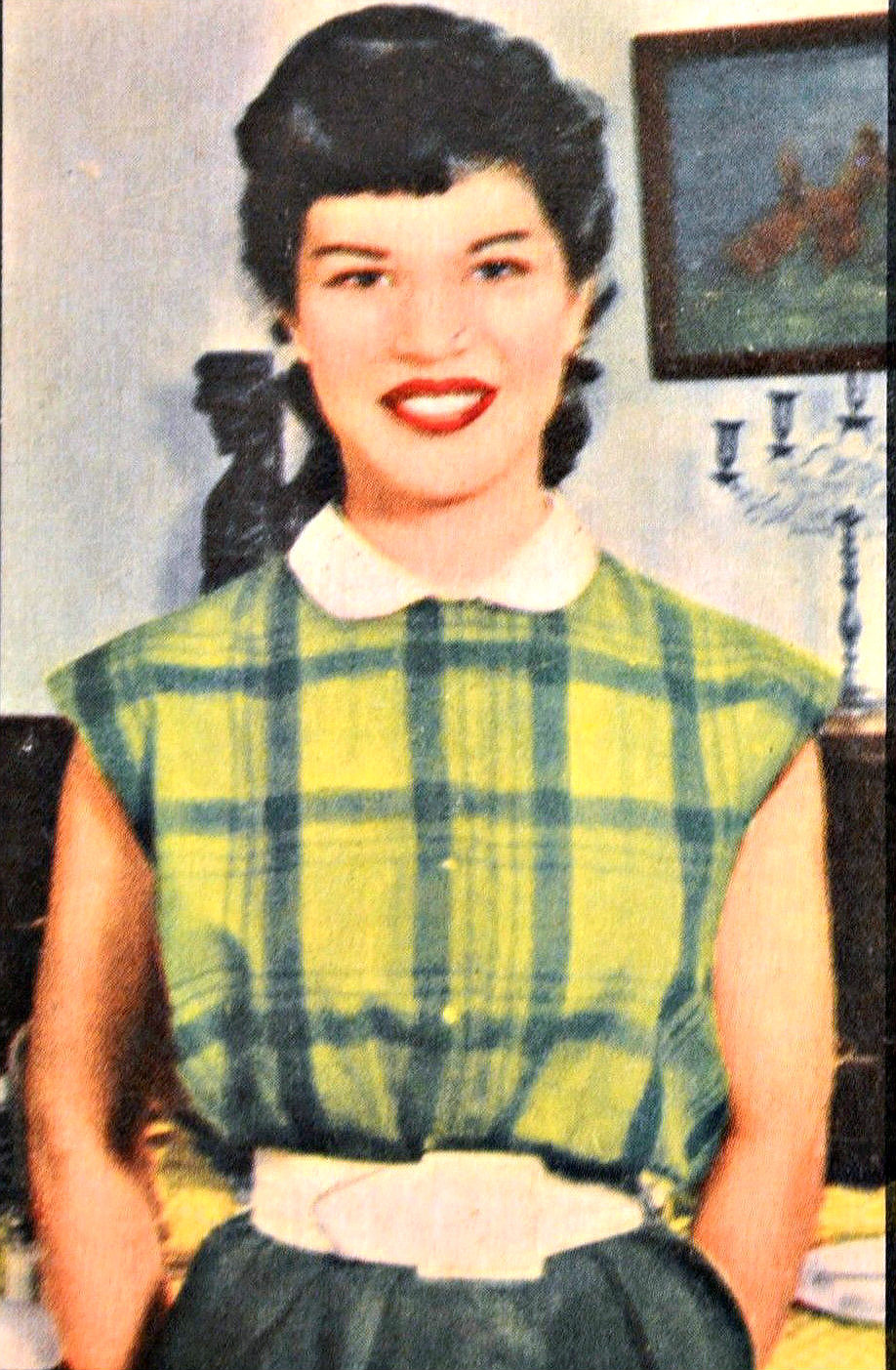
- McQuade as Rosalie Goldberg
- Born: May 29, 1936; New York City, New York, U.S.
- Died: April 21, 2014 (aged 77); Santa Fe, New Mexico, U.S.
- Occupation: Actress
- Known for: The Goldbergs
- Spouse: Valentin de Vargas (m. 1960; div. 1967)
- Children: 2

Arlene McQuade (May 29, 1936 – April 21, 2014) was an American television, radio and theater actress best known for her portrayal of Rosalie on the CBS series, The Goldbergs. She had the same role in Molly (1951), a film adaption of the radio series.

McQuade was the daughter of Arthur and Rita McQuade. She began acting when she was 4 years old.

McQuade appeared on Broadway in Summer and Smoke (1948). She also appeared in one episode of the television series Alfred Hitchcock Presents in 1960.

== Personal life and death ==
McQuade died at a nursing home in Santa Fe, New Mexico, on April 21, 2014, aged 77, after a long battle with Parkinson's disease. She had been the first wife of actor, Valentin de Vargas (died 2013) whom she met on the set of Touch of Evil.

== Selected Filmography ==
Year	Title	Role	Notes
1950	The Goldbergs	Rosalie Goldberg	
1958	Touch of Evil	Ginnie	Uncredited
1960	Alfred Hitchcock Presents	Gloria	Season 5 Episode 28: "Forty Detectives Later"
1960	Have Gun, Will Travel	Princess Aouda	
