= Philip Loeb Humanitarian Award =

American theatre award

This award was named in memory of the blacklisted prominent actor and Actors' Equity Association worker Philip Loeb, who committed suicide in 1955 after losing his craft to McCarthyism. The award honors an Equity member "who has performed a unique and outstanding service on behalf of his or her fellow members and whose quality of service, ideas and contribution has set him or her apart from others; someone who truly perpetuates the legacy inherited from Philip Loeb."

== Recipients ==
- William Ross
- Iggie Wolfington
- Florida Friebus
- Edith Meiser
