= Menasha the Magnificent =

American TV situation comedy series (1950)

- Genre: Sitcom
- Written by: Matt Brooks; Louis Quinn
- Directed by: Alan Neuman
- Starring: Menasha Skulnik; Jean Cleveland; Zamah Cunningham; Vinton Hayworth; Danny Leane
- Country of origin: United States
- Original language: English

Production
- Running time: 30 minutes
- Production company: Martin Goodman Productions

Original release
- Network: NBC
- Release: July 30 – September 11, 1950

Menasha the Magnificent is an American television situation comedy that was broadcast on NBC from July 3, 1950, through September 11, 1950.

== Overview ==
Although Menasha ("a little fellow with a hop-like walk and a tragicomic mien") began each day on an optimistic note, trouble usually occurred. The meek Menasha managed a restaurant, where he was regularly pushed around by the dominant owner, Mrs. Davis. Menasha Skulnik played the title role. Mrs. Davis was portrayed by Jean Cleveland in the initial episode, but Zamah Cunningham had the role thereafter. The supporting cast included Vinton Hayworth and Danny Leane.

== Production ==
Menasha the Magnificent was a summer replacement for The Chevrolet Tele-Theatre. It was produced by Martin Goodman Productions, with Goodman as the producer. Alan Neuman was the director. Writers included Matt Brooks and Louis Quinn as writers. The sustaining program was broadcast live on Mondays from 8 to 8:30 p.m. Eastern Time. A pilot episode (advertised as "A Test Attraction" and called "The Magnificent Menasha") of the show was broadcast on February 20, 1950.

== Critical response ==
A review of the July 3, 1950, episode in the trade publication Variety said that the show's writers "missed both the tragedy and the comedy" in creating a tragicomic character. The review said that the script and the performances were "wan and cliched", resulting in "a tedious and trite half-hour".

Writing in The Sunday Star newspaper, Harry MacArthur called Skulnik "a highly talented Yiddish comedian" and added, "His wonderfully woeful countenance and his superb comedy timing and delivery are sometimes better than his material, but it is a pleasure to have him around."
