= Sanka =

Brand of instant decaffeinated coffee

- Product type: Coffee
- Current owner: Kraft Heinz
- Country: U.S.
- Introduced: 1923; 103 years ago
- Website: kraftheinz.com/sanka

Sanka is a brand of instant decaffeinated coffee, sold around the world, and was one of the earliest decaffeinated varieties. Sanka is distributed in the United States by Kraft Heinz.

== History ==
Decaffeinated coffee was developed in 1903 by a team of researchers led by Ludwig Roselius in Bremen, Germany. It was first sold in Germany and many other European countries in 1905–1906 under the name Kaffee HAG (short for Kaffee Handels-Aktien-Gesellschaft, or Coffee Trading Public Company). In France, the brand name became Sanka, derived from the French words sans caféine ("without caffeine"). The brand came to the United States in 1909–1910, where it was first marketed under the name "Dekafa" or "Dekofa" by an American sales agent.

In 1914, Roselius founded his own company, Kaffee Hag Corporation, in New York. When Kaffee Hag was confiscated by the Alien Property Custodian during World War I, and sold to an American firm, Roselius lost not only his company, but also the American trademark rights to the name. To re-establish his product, he began to use the Sanka brand name in America.

In Europe, the Hag company used the Sanka brand in many countries (the Netherlands, Belgium, Germany, and Switzerland, amongst others) as a cheaper alternative to the premium brand Coffee Hag. The brand disappeared in these countries after World War II, but it continued until the 1970s as the premium brand in France. First marketed in the U.S. in 1923, Sanka was initially sold only at two Sanka Coffee Houses in New York, but it soon was brought into retail.

== Advertising ==
The intensive American advertising campaigns included the 1927 broadcasts of Sanka After-Dinner Hour (or Sanka Music, Sanka After-Dinner Music, Sanka Music Hour, and Sanka After-Dinner Coffee Hour), heard at 6:30 pm Tuesdays on New York's WEAF. Sanka was a sponsor of I Love Lucy, The Twilight Zone, and The Andy Griffith Show during their respective runs on CBS television in the 1950s and early 1960s. The Andy Griffith Show Sanka sponsor spots featured the cast members. It was also a sponsor of The Goldbergs (1920s to about 1960 on radio and television, unrelated to the U.S. 2013 ABC television series) where, on many episodes, Mrs. Goldberg (Gertrude Berg) would address the camera and talk to the TV audience and tell them about Sanka coffee. After the sales pitch, she would walk away, usually from the window, and start the show.

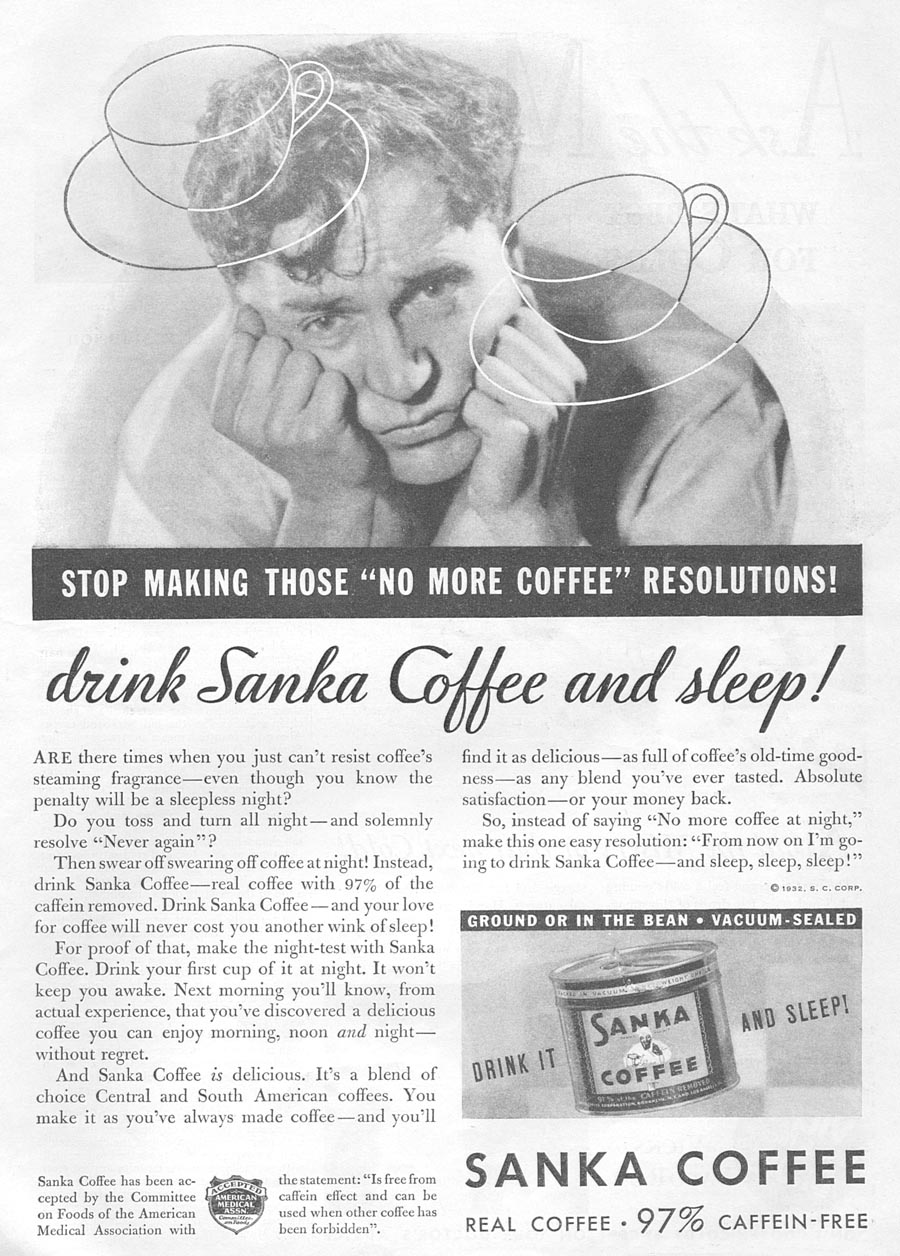
A 1932 advertisement for Sanka (US)

With such promotion, Sanka became a nationwide sales success, with General Foods Corporation taking over distribution in 1928 as a defensive measure, since Sanka directly competed with its noncaffeine coffee substitute Postum. The bright orange label that made Sanka easily identifiable to consumers found its way into coffee shops around the country in the form of the decaf coffee pot. Coffee pots with a bright orange handle are a direct result of the American public's association of the color orange with Sanka, no matter which brand of coffee is actually served. Businesses that serve rival Folgers decaffeinated coffee usually have green-handled pots.

From 1976 to 1982, veteran actor Robert Young was Sanka's television spokesman, appearing in a whole series of commercials. During the mid-1980s, a series of Sanka television commercials aired featuring Lena Horne.
