= William Traylor =

American actor (1930–1989)

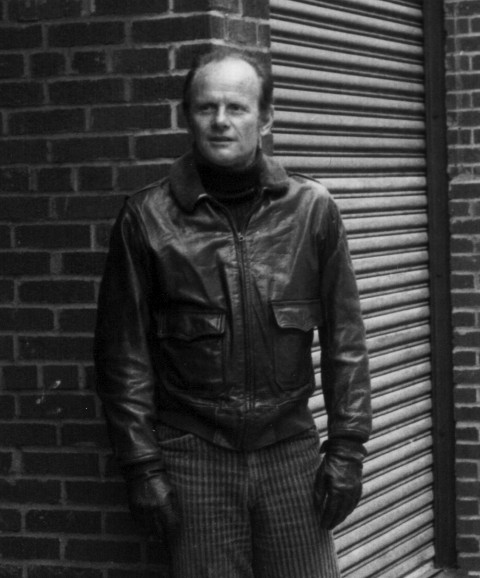
- Traylor in 1978
- Born: William Hurley Traylor Jr. October 8, 1930; Kirksville, Missouri, U.S.
- Died: September 23, 1989 (aged 58); Los Angeles, California, U.S.
- Other names: Bill Traylor, William Hurley Traylor
- Occupation: Actor
- Years active: 1954–1989
- Spouse: Peggy Feury (m. 1961; died 1985)
- Children: 2, including Susan Traylor

William Hurley Traylor Jr. (October 8, 1930 – September 23, 1989) was an American film, stage, and television actor. He was also, along with his wife, Peggy Feury, an acting coach and founder of The Loft Studio, an acting school attended by such major stars as Sean Penn, Anjelica Huston and Nicolas Cage. He is the father of actresses Stephanie Feury and Susan Traylor.

== Early life ==
He was born William Hurley Traylor Jr. in Kirksville, Missouri, to parents Edna Mae (Singleton) and William Hurley Traylor Sr. Kirksville had a population of 8,293 at the time. A fellow member of the Actors Studio, Geraldine Page, was also born in Kirksville. Traylor and his two siblings, sisters Patricia (Traylor) Weber and Lucille (Traylor) Jorgenson, were raised in the Brashear, Missouri area, where William Sr. operated an oil business and service station. Brashear is a small farm town with the Hog Branch stream running through one corner of it. When Traylor lived there, it had a population of only about 438 people, though it has shrunk considerably since then.

== Actors Studio ==
In his twenties, William Traylor arrived in New York City, where he studied acting, and soon became a member of the Actors Studio. The Actors Studio was founded in 1947 by Elia Kazan, Cheryl Crawford, Robert Lewis and Anna Sokolow, to provide training for actors. Lee Strasberg joined later and became its director in 1951. The Actors Studio is known for teaching method acting, as it evolved out of the Group Theatre in the 1930s and the ideas of Constantin Stanislavski.

As a member of the Actors Studio in New York, Traylor, along with others, participated in a program to record and archive work that was being done there, including performances of scenes from dramatic literature. Traylor participated in these recordings from 1961 to 1968. These recordings have been archived as part of the University of Wisconsin Digital Collections.

== Television ==
As an actor in New York, Traylor began appearing in roles in television dramas during what has become known as the Golden Age of television. He appeared in Screen Directors Playhouse, Highway Patrol, I Led 3 Lives, The Alcoa Hour, Goodyear Playhouse, Flipper, Father Knows Best, Naked City, and others.

== Theatre ==
He also performed on stage in theatres on Broadway as well as off Broadway, and in theatres in the region. His debut on Broadway occurred on November 14, 1957 at the Belasco Theatre, and was a remarkable opportunity. Traylor appeared in two comedies written by and starring theatre legend Noël Coward: Present Laughter with Traylor appearing as Roland Maule, and Nude With Violin with Traylor appearing as Clinton Preminger. Other cast members included Eva Gabor, Morris Carnovsky, Joyce Carey, and Mona Washbourne. The plays were produced together, and performed on different nights in repertory. Traylor received positive personal notices for his Broadway debut.

During that production, Traylor had a problematic and apparently sexual relationship with Coward, which caused them both anguish, and resulted in an apparent suicide attempt by Traylor. The run of show ended soon after, and the company dispersed. In 2013, British playwright, James Martin Charlton, used this episode as the basis for a fictionalized theatrical dramatization, entitled Coward. According to the press and the reviews of the production, the names of the characters, and the setting, and the period were all changed in the manner of a roman à clef, and none of the fictional characters were portrayed in an especially positive light by the playwright.

Traylor went on to appear on Broadway in The Glass Menagerie, Show Boat, and Of Love Remembered, which was directed by Burgess Meredith.

== Los Angeles ==
He met and married a fellow Actors Studio member, the actress Peggy Feury in 1961. Eventually, professional opportunities drew Traylor to Los Angeles. His family, which now included two young children, Stephanie and Susan, left New York to join him in Los Angeles. On September 23, 1989, just 14 days before his 59th birthday, he suddenly died from a heart attack at his home.

In Los Angeles, he appeared in television dramas and series, including Adam-12, Bracken's World, The F.B.I., McMillan & Wife, Mannix, Kung Fu and The Execution of Private Slovik.

== Films ==
His film work includes Cisco Pike (1972), The Towering Inferno (1974), Smile (1975), S*H*E (1980), The Long Riders (1980), The Postman Always Rings Twice (1981), The Adventures of Buckaroo Banzai Across the 8th Dimension (1984), Fletch (1985) (for which he is best remembered as the uptight Mr. Underhill) and others.

Year	Title	Role	Notes
1955	The Last Frontier	Soldier	Uncredited
1961	One Plus One	Hollister	("Honeymoon' segment)
1964	Diary of a Bachelor	The Bachelor	
1968	Windflowers	FBI Agent #1	
1968	The Boston Strangler	Arnie Carr	
1970	Colossus: The Forbin Project	Party Guest	Uncredited
1972	Cisco Pike	Jack	
1972	The Legend of Hillbilly John	Reverend Millen	
1974	The Towering Inferno	Security Guard in Control Room	Uncredited
1975	Smile	Ray Brandy	
1980	S*H*E	Lacey	
1980	The Long Riders	Pinkerton	
1981	The Postman Always Rings Twice	Sackett	
1983	The Man with Two Brains	Inspector	
1984	The Adventures of Buckaroo Banzai Across the 8th Dimension	General Catburd	
1985	Fletch	Ted Underhill	
1989	Fletch Lives	Ted Underhill	
1989	Dead Bang	Elton Tremmel	(final film role)

== Teacher ==
He and his wife, Peggy Feury, together founded the Loft Studio to teach acting. The Loft Studio became a greatly admired acting studio, where Traylor and Feury brought the precepts of Stanislavski, and lessons from their own experiences at the Actors Studio, and the Neighborhood Playhouse in New York. They taught a remarkable roster of actors, including Sean Penn, Johnny Depp, Ellen Burstyn, Jeff Goldblum, Lily Tomlin, Joanna Kerns, Annette O'Toole, John Mayall, Anjelica Huston, Meg Tilly, Nicolas Cage, Michelle Pfeiffer and Callie Khouri — who wrote the film Thelma and Louise.
