= The Zulu and the Zayda =

1965 American musical play

- Sheet music cover (cropped)
- Music: Harold Rome
- Lyrics: Harold Rome
- Book: Howard Da Silva and Felix Leon
- Productions: 1965 Broadway

The Zulu and the Zayda is a musical play by Howard Da Silva and Felix Leon, with music and lyrics by Harold Rome (his last musical score to be produced on Broadway), and directed by Dore Schary. It was based on a story by Dan Jacobson. Described as a comedy with music, the play has two acts and 18 scenes.

Produced by Theodore Mann and Dore Schary, the Broadway production, opened on 10 November 1965 at the Cort Theatre, where it ran for 179 performances. The cast included Menasha Skulnik, Ossie Davis, and Louis Gossett. It also featured Yaphet Kotto in his first Broadway appearance. The production's costumes were designed by Frank Thompson.

== Plot ==
Set in Johannesburg, South Africa, this comedy is about a lively Jewish grandfather (zayda is the Yiddish word for grandfather) who moves to Africa from London, whose family (the Grossmans) hires Paulus, a native (a member of the Zulu tribe), and brother of a family servant, as a companion, and "grandfather sitter." The relationship between the zayda and Paulus, the Zulu, bridges the gulf between black and white, Africa and Europe, and age and youth, as Paulus teaches his new friend local Zulu phrases while he himself learns Yiddish expressions. Eventually, local prejudices interfere, but there is a happy ending.

The play description written by C. Burr, included on the original cast album, notes:

THE ZULU AND THE ZAYDA is a play with music about two remarkably undiscouraged people living under very discouraging circumstances. The Zulu's circumstances are, as most of us know and feel, that he lives in a homeland taken over by white proprietors in which he must watch every step and every breath just to keep what little freedom he has left to him....

A zayda, as we learn, is a Jewish grandfather. This particular zayda is 79 years old and has been twice uprooted in his life, first from Slutsk, his native village in Czarist Russia, and more recently from London, where for many years he was happily selling wares from a pushcart. Now he finds himself in Johannesburg, where his devoted son, who runs a prosperous hardware store and nervously tries to avoid trouble while raising a family, has brought him to live out the rest of his years.

== Background ==
Dan Jacobson, the author of the original story upon which this work was based, was born in 1929 in Johannesburg, South Africa, where his family had fled to escape persecution of Jews in Europe. His grandfather had been a rabbi in Lithuania. Many of his stories and novels dealt with issues of prejudice and racism. The original story, "The Zulu and the Zeide", was also the basis of a one-man performance without music, created and performed by Michael Picardie of the Everyman Theater in Cardiff, Wales as part of the 2004 Leeds (UK) International Jewish Theater Festival.

Harold Rome was familiar with the Jewish background of "the zayda" because of his own Jewish background, but he was also familiar with African culture since he had been a collector of African art since 1939, eventually bringing together one of the most important collections of such art in the world. Additionally, he was intrigued with African music, resulting in a score that combined elements of music from both African and Jewish cultures.

It has been suggested that the reason the production is sometimes referred to as a play with music or a comedy with music, rather than a "musical," is the absence of dance numbers.

The play was originally scheduled to open on 9 November 1965, but the massive power outage that hit the northeastern United States that evening forced the opening to be postponed a day.

== Cast album ==
A cast recording of the original production was released by Columbia Records in 1965. The album cover includes a number of Yiddish and Zulu words and expressions used in the play, translated by Harold Rome, including "awuyelelemama," translated as the Zulu equivalent of the Yiddish word, "oy."

The album was reissued on CD in 2011 and an MP3 download is available on iTunes.

== Musical numbers ==
The musical numbers and original cast performers, as listed on the 1965 original cast album (Columbia Records, KOL 6480), include:

Act I

- Prelude—orchestra
- "Tkambuza" – Ossie Davis
- "It’s Good to Be Alive" – Menasha Skulnik, Louis Gossett
- "Crocodile Wife" – Ossie Davis
- "Rivers of Tears" – Menasha Skulnik
- "The Water Wears Down the Stone" – Ossie Davis
- "Like the Breeze Blows" – Peter DeAnda, Christine Spencer,
  Ensemble
- "Oisgetzaychent" (Out of This World) – Menasha Skulnik, Ensemble

Act II

- Entr'acte—Orchestra
- "Some Things" – Ensemble
- "Zulu Love Song" – Louis Gossett
- "May Your Heart Stay Young" – Menasha Skulnik, Ensemble
- "How Cold, Cold, Cold" – Ossie Davis
- "Eagle Soliloquy" – Louis Gossett
- Finale—Menasha Skulnik, cast

== Opening night cast ==
The cast and characters on opening night included:

- Norman Barrs: Tommy Layton
- Sarah Cunningham: Helen Grossman
- Ossie Davis: Johannes
- Peter DeAnda: Peter
- Louis Gossett: Paulus
- Ed Hall: William
- Robert Hewitt: Groenwald
- James Higgins: Koofer
- Max Jacobs: Dyckboom
- John Randolph Jones: Eric
- Sandra Kent: Woman with Baby Carriage, and Nurse
- Yaphet Kotto: John
- Sholom Ludvinsky: Mourner
- David Mogck: Policeman
- Charles Moore: Mr. Lamene
- John Pleshette: David Grossman
- Joe Silver: Harry Grossman
- Menasha Skulnik: Zayda
- Christine Spencer: Joan
- Ella Thompson: Mrs. Lamene
- Philip Vandervort: Arthur Grossman

== Opening night production credits ==
The following list includes credits noted on the production's opening night:

- Producers: Dore Schary and Theodore Mann
- Book: Howard Da Silva and Felix Leon, based on the story, "The Zulu and the Zeide," by Dan Jacobson, published in 1959.
- Music: Harold J. Rome
- Lyrics: Harold J. Rome
- Music orchestrated by Meyer Kupferman
- Director: Dore Schary
- Scenic Design: William and Jean Eckart
- Costume Design: Frank Thompson
- Lighting Design: William and Jean Eckart
- Production Stage Manager: Jeb Schary and Harry Young
- Musical Supervisor: Meyer Kupferman
- Conductor:Michael Spivakowsky
- Press Representatives: Lawrence Belling, Violet Welles,
  Merle Debuskey and Reuben Rabinovitch

== Reviews ==
The New York Daily News called the play "...something to warm the heart, lighten the spirit." Some reviewers noted that this production showed that "the social conscience that had marked" Harold Rome's early works was "still intact," as evidenced by the way this work dealt with racial and religious intolerance.

Even reviews that were not completely positive about the production as a whole noted Skulnik's performance. For example, a Time magazine reviewer wrote that:

The consolation prize is Menasha Skulnik, a totally endearing imp of 70. His face is a relief map of mischief and melancholy, and there is a laugh hidden in every crease. The stage may be stationary—Skulnik never is. Visions of sour pickles and gefilte fish seem to dance in his head.

Pearl Harand, who recreated the production as a one-woman performance, interspersing dialogue, story description, and song, described the work as follows:

Through the eyes of the grandfather and the Zulu you see the story of apartheid, the agony of the grandfather's geriatric life in a strange land, and the beautiful association that develops between the two as they become more father and son than elder and servant.... It's all about putting yourself in the shoes and skin and voice of the characters and relating every moment to communicating with the characters around you. The message of The Zulu and the Zayda is simply that it's great to be alive, and that's a great message.
