= Yoo-Hoo, Mrs. Goldberg =

- Directed by: Aviva Kempner
- Written by: Aviva Kempner
- Produced by: Aviva Kempner
- Music by: Fred Karns
- Release date: 2009
- Running time: 1h 32m
- Country: United States
- Language: English

Yoo-Hoo, Mrs. Goldberg is a 2009 documentary film on the broadcast career of Gertrude Berg and her radio and television serials, The Goldbergs. Aviva Kempner directed the film, interviewing family members of Berg, cast members of the Goldbergs and historians of radio and television. She also includes interview statements by non-celebrities, and celebrities, including All Things Considered anchor Susan Stamberg, Supreme Court Justice Ruth Bader Ginsburg, television sitcom producer Norman Lear and Mary Tyler Moore Show actor Ed Asner.

== Summary ==
The film follows Berg's early years of marriage, her short period in New Orleans, her move to New York City, to her work in the radio and television renditions of The Goldbergs. The film devotes attention to the role of The Goldbergs in helping to present a congenial image of a striving Jewish family to the broader American public, and the tremendous popularity that the radio and television shows experienced. Stamberg deems Berg, "the Oprah of her day."

Yoo-Hoo, Mrs. Goldberg addresses developments contemporaneous with the years of The Goldbergs, Kristallnacht, the American Nazi German-American Bund and right-wing radio lecturer Father Coughlin. It also deals with Berg's struggle against the McCarthy Era blacklisters and the influence of Red Channels. The film ends with the end of the television program and Berg's post-Goldbergs professional career.

== Accolades ==
In 2009, the film won the San Francisco Jewish Film Festival Freedom of Expression Award.

== Reception ==
It received 93% on Rotten Tomatoes and 69 on Metacritic.

== See also ==
- Old-time radio
- 2009 in film
- Golden Age of Television (1950s-1960s)
