= Marian Winters =

American actress and dramatist

- Born: Marian Weinstein; April 19, 1920; New York City, New York, U.S.
- Died: November 3, 1978 (aged 58)
- Occupations: Actress, dramatist
- Spouse: Jerome H. "Jay" Smolin (1946/1947–November 3, 1978; her death)
- Awards: Tony Award for Best Performance by a Featured Actress in a Play (1952) for I Am a Camera

Marian Winters (April 19, 1920 – November 3, 1978) was an American dramatist and actress of stage, film, and television.

== Biography ==
Marian Winters was born Marian Weinstein, the eldest of four daughters born to Morris and Sophie Weinstein. Her three sisters, Shirley Zeisel (died 2010), Elaine Singer (died 2014), and Annette Laster (died 2019), long outlived her. She was raised in New York City. She made her debut in summer stock in her teens. She began her career on Broadway understudying Frances Dee in The Secret Room (1945). She also played Lady Constance in King John, and toured in such plays as Detective Story, The Heiress and Dream Girl.

Winters achieved fame for her role in I Am a Camera as Natalia Landauer. For this performance she was awarded various acting honors including the 1952 Tony Award as a Best Supporting or Featured Actress. In 1955, she played Gelda in the American production of The Dark is Light Enough, a verse drama by Christopher Fry, which starred Katharine Cornell and Tyrone Power. Her last role was in Deathtrap.

== Writing ==
In 1967, Winters won an Emmy for her television adaptation of Animal Keepers, one of the three one-act plays comprising A is for All.

== Death ==
Her tenure in Deathtrap was cut short due to cancer, which claimed her life on November 3, 1978. She was succeeded in her role (Helga Ten Dorp) by Elizabeth Parrish. The role was played by Irene Worth in the film version.

== Personal life ==
Winters was married to NBC executive Jerome H. "Jay" Smolin (November 29, 1919 – October 21, 2010) from circa 1946/1947 until her death in 1978. The couple had no children.

== Stage productions ==
- The Dark Is Light Enough as Gelda (February 23, 1955 to April 23, 1955)
- Auntie Mame as Sally Cato MacDougal (October 31, 1956 to June 28, 1958)
- Tall Story as Myra Solomon (January 29, 1959 to May 22, 1959)
- The 49th Cousin as Tracy Lowe (October 27, 1960 to January 21, 1961)
- Nobody Loves an Albatross as Marge Weber (December 19, 1963 to June 20, 1964)
- Mating Dance (November 3, 1965 to November 3, 1965)
- Deathtrap as Helga ten Dorp (February 26, 1978 until October 1978)

== Television ==
- Lux Video Theatre (1952)
- Play of the Week (1960)
- The Defenders (1962)
- The Nurses (1963)
- Paradise Lost (1974)
