= The Goldbergs (radio series) =

American radio and television comedy-drama program

- Original television series DVD-release cover
- Other names: The Rise of the Goldbergs
- Genre: Daytime serial drama: Weekly (1929), Daily (1931)
- Running time: 15 minutes (12-13 minutes excluding ads), 30 minutes (24-26 minutes excluding ads)
- Country of origin: United States
- Language: English
- Syndicates: NBC, CBS
- TV adaptations: The Goldbergs
- Starring: Gertrude Berg; Philip Loeb; Harold J. Stone; Robert H. Harris; Eli Mintz; Larry Robinson; Arlene McQuade
- Announcer: Clayton "Bud" Collyer
- Created by: Gertrude Berg
- Written by: Gertrude Berg, Cherney Berg
- Directed by: Wess McKee, Henry Salinger
- Original release: November 20, 1929 – 1956
- Audio format: Mono
- Opening theme: Enrico Toselli's "Serenade"
- Sponsored by: Duz; Oxydol; Pepsodent; Sanka; Vitamin Corp. of America; RCA; Rybutol; Ekco Flint
- Podcast: Stream Radio Program from Archive.org

The Goldbergs was a comedy-drama broadcast from 1929 to 1946 on American radio and from 1949 to 1956 on American television. It was adapted into the 1948 play Me and Molly, the 1950 film The Goldbergs, and the 1973 Broadway musical Molly. It also spun off a comic strip from June 8, 1944, to December 21, 1945, with art by Irwin Hasen, a comic book artist who worked on various DC Comics titles and later did the Dondi comic strip.

== Radio ==
The program was devised by writer-actress Gertrude Berg in 1928 and sold to the NBC radio network in 1929. It was a domestic comedy featuring the home life of a Jewish family, supposedly at 1038 East Tremont Avenue in the Bronx. In addition to writing the scripts and directing each episode, Berg starred as bighearted, lovingly meddlesome, and somewhat stereotypical Jewish matriarch Molly Goldberg. The show began as a portrait of Jewish tenement life before later evoking such growing pains as moving into a more suburban setting and struggling with Jewish assimilation while sustaining their roots.

The Goldbergs began as a weekly 15-minute program called The Rise of the Goldbergs on November 20, 1929, going daily in 1931. The series moved to CBS in 1936 with the title shortened to The Goldbergs. Like other 15-minute comedies of the day, such as Amos 'n' Andy, Lum and Abner, Easy Aces, Vic and Sade and Myrt and Marge, The Goldbergs was a serial with running storylines. Berg's usual introduction (in character as Molly, hollering); "yoo-hoo! Is anybody...?" became a catchphrase. In the 1940s, this was followed by Bud Collyer announcing; "here she is, folks: that's Molly Goldberg, a woman with a place in every heart and a finger in every pie".

When Gertrude Berg missed a couple of weeks due to illness, stations carrying the popular show were flooded with get-well mail. At the height of the show's popularity, Life wrote: "for millions of Americans, listening to The Goldbergs... has been a happy ritual akin to slipping on a pair of comfortable old shoes that never seem to wear out".

In The Big Broadcast 1920–1950, radio historians Frank Buxton and Bill Owen say the series (which they consider a soap opera as much as a comedy) "differed from most of the other 'soaps' in that its leading characters lived through relatively normal situations. Even though it was the story of a poor Jewish family in the Bronx, New York, it had identification for a wide segment of listeners". Of the 15-minute serial comedies, only Amos 'n' Andy enjoyed a longer radio life than The Goldbergs.

The role of husband Jake Goldberg was originally played by Himan Brown and later by James R. Waters. When Waters died suddenly in 1945, Berg resisted recasting the role. Instead, she simply had Molly refer to Jake, occasionally setting up dialogue in which his reply was not heard when she spoke to him.

== Behind the scenes ==
Berg was not averse to incorporating serious real-world issues affecting Jewish families. One 1939 episode addressed Kristallnacht and Nazi Germany (including a rock through the family window as the Goldbergs had their Passover Seder); other World War II-era episodes alluded to friends or family members trying to escape the Holocaust. However, these were sporadic deviations from the show's main theme of family, neighborhood, and the balance between old-world values and new-world assimilation. Molly demonstrates to the audience the strong matriarch she is by constantly helping others with their dilemmas and proving to be the hero time and time again.

The Goldbergs was so popular that performing stars in other arts sought to appear on it. Berg cast Metropolitan Opera star Jan Peerce almost annually to sing on Yom Kippur and Passover. Another famous singer of the day, Ernestine Schumann-Heink, personally asked Berg to appear, and Berg wrote her into three episodes. Regina Resnik (an international soprano and later mezzo who had an international career, including at the Met) starred in a TV episode. The radio cast included Roslyn Silber and Alfred Ryder as children Rosalie and Sammy, Menasha Skulnik as Uncle David, Arnold Stang as Seymour Fingerhood, Garson Kanin as Eli Edwards, and Zina Provendie as Sylvia Allison.

=== Moves into stage and television ===
In 1948, Berg wrote and staged Me and Molly, a Broadway version of the show. A year later, she brought The Goldbergs to a national audience on television.

== Television ==
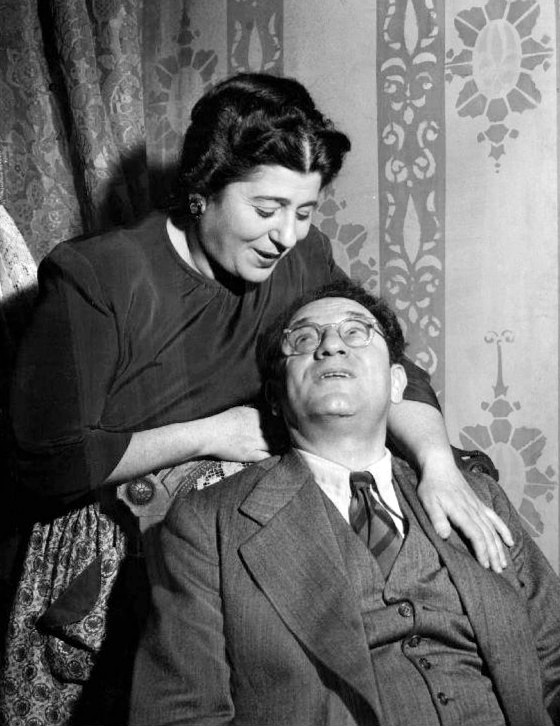
Gertrude Berg and Philip Loeb (1949)

The television version ran on CBS Television from 1949 to 1951 and co-starred Philip Loeb as Jake Goldberg. He and Gertrude Berg reprised their roles in the 1950 film of the same name. The show almost did not get to the small screen at all: CBS executives were uncertain that it would work on TV as well as it did on radio. But Berg prevailed, and picked up General Foods (Sanka coffee) as its sponsor. Berg, who continued to write every episode, insisted that no studio audience be used and made sure everyday events formed the basis of the stories; she was once quoted as saying she avoided "anything that will bother people ... unions, fund raising, Zionism, socialism, intergroup relations. ... I keep things average. I don't want to lose friends." In 1950, Berg won the first Best Actress Emmy Award for her role as Molly on The Goldbergs.

The Goldbergs spent almost a decade on television—but not without disruptions. In 1950, Philip Loeb was blacklisted and pressure was placed on Berg (who owned the TV version as she had the radio original) to fire him. When she refused, General Foods canceled its sponsorship, and CBS dropped it from their schedule by June 1951.

But eight months later, NBC—the show's original broadcasting home—picked up the series for the 1952–53 season, on the condition that Loeb not remain with the series. Berg gave in, and the series reappeared in a twice-weekly, early-evening 15-minute format (with another change in title, to Molly, in due course), with Harold Stone and then Robert H. Harris replacing Loeb as Jake, though Berg quietly continued to pay Loeb a salary. After The Goldbergs ended its CBS run, Tom Taylor replaced Larry Robinson in the role of Molly's son, Sammy. The rest of the television cast included Eli Mintz as Uncle David, Arlene McQuade as Rosalie and Betty Bendyke as Dora Barnett. On radio, Sammy and Rosalie had grown up and gotten married; on television, the characters were revived as teenagers. During this time, Gertrude Berg and Arlene McQuade appeared as their characters of Molly and Rosalie, respectively, when they guested on NBC-TV's Buick-Berle Show starring Milton Berle.

In 1954, the show reverted to a weekly half-hour, moving to the DuMont network for a run from April to October. The series was originally intended to run for six months on DuMont, but, due to financial difficulties, the network was unable to fulfill the $5 million contract, despite Nielsen ratings estimated at ten million viewers. The DuMont shows were aired live.

A final version, aired in syndication, was filmed in 1955 and aired on local stations until 1956. This version moved the Goldbergs from the Bronx to the New York suburb of Haverville. In a way this mirrored the real life journey of many Jewish families from the Bronx to the suburbs and other parts of New York during this period. However, this was considered the death knell of the show, as it was felt that the Goldbergs were only the Goldbergs in the Bronx. Also in 1955, Philip Loeb, beset by depression and unable to find other work, committed suicide. In 1957, Gertrude Berg made her last two appearances as Molly Goldberg: first on an episode of the NBC-TV variety series Washington Square with Ray Bolger, and then on a Kate Smith special that aired on ABC-TV.

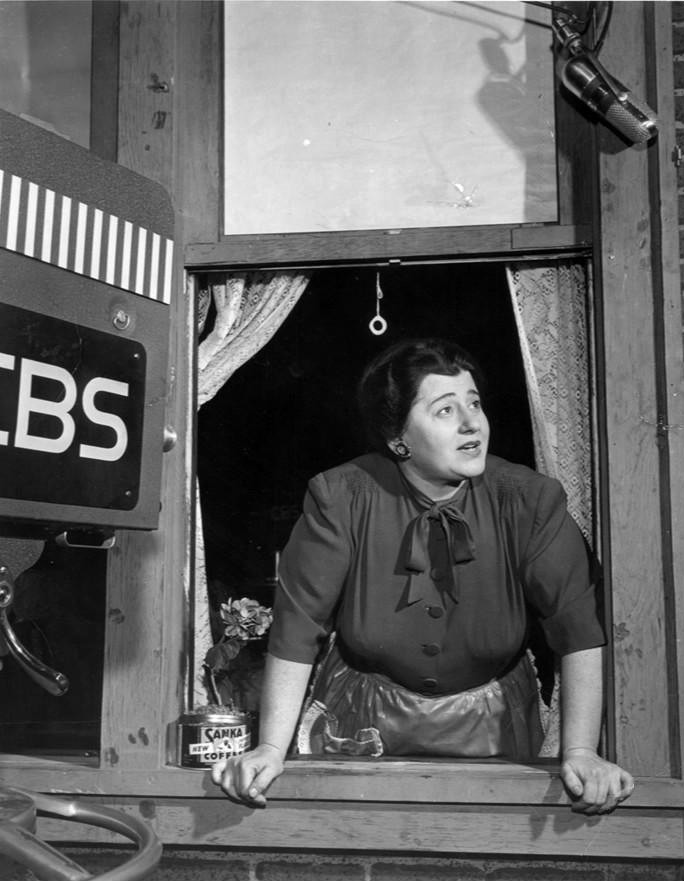
Gertrude Berg as Molly Goldberg on the show's set

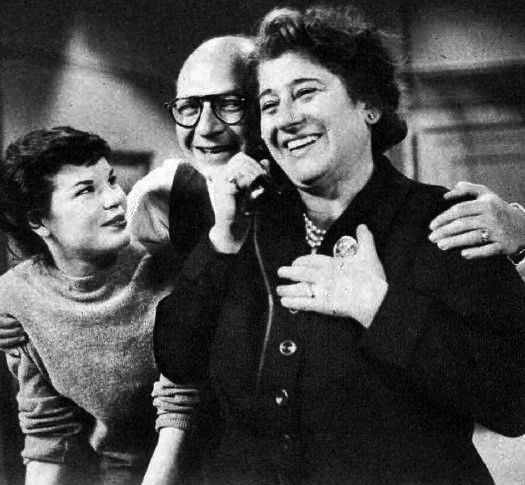
Rosalie, Jake and Molly

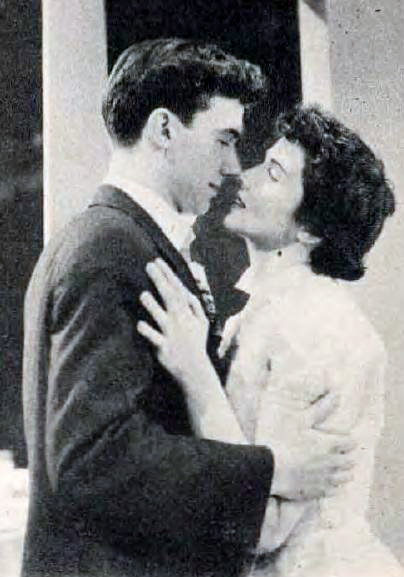
Sammy and Dora Barnett

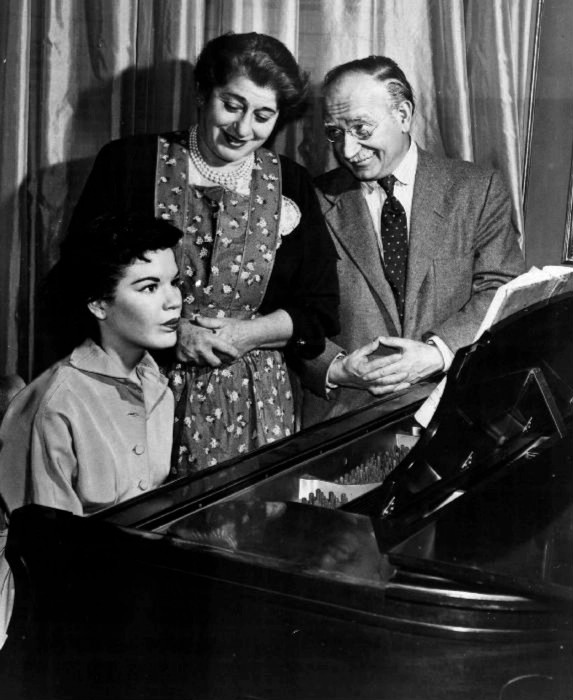
Uncle David and Molly with Rosalie at the piano

== Aftermath ==
Gertrude Berg returned to television six years later in a situation comedy, Mrs. G. Goes to College, playing Sarah Green, a Molly Goldberg-like character. Despite being retitled The Gertrude Berg Show in mid-year, the program was cancelled after one season. The Goldbergs is available to collectors and fans in a large number of surviving radio episodes and some surviving television episodes, many of which have lapsed into the public domain. Aviva Kempner's documentary Yoo-Hoo, Mrs. Goldberg (2009) deals with the show, and to an extent, Gertrude Berg's personal life.

Most of the DuMont episodes survive at the UCLA Film and Television Archive, while the 39 filmed episodes survive intact.

Since 2009, the series can be seen on the JLTV cable network.

== Home media ==
In March 2010, Shout! Factory released The Goldbergs: The Ultimate Goldbergs on DVD via their retail website. The release includes all 71 extant episodes of the television series. Episodes are also available to stream on their ShoutFactoryTV service.

The UCLA Film and Television Archive digitally restored all of the episodes, as well as provided 12 radio episodes for the DVD release and the pilot for the short lived series Mrs. G Goes To College (1961). The box set is available from UCLA. The UCLA archive also holds 130 transcription discs of the radio series, which it has released on YouTube.

== See also ==
- List of radio soaps
- Yoo-Hoo, Mrs. Goldberg
- List of programs broadcast by the DuMont Television Network
- List of surviving DuMont Television Network broadcasts

== Listen to ==
- Internet Archive: The Goldbergs
- Webcast on Gertrude Berg, The Paley Center for Media, "From The Goldbergs to 2005: The Evolution of the Family Sitcom" (November 16, 2005)
- Free OTR: The Goldbergs (59 episodes)
- "The Goldbergs". RadioEchoes. 1935–1945.
