= Menasha Skulnik =

American actor

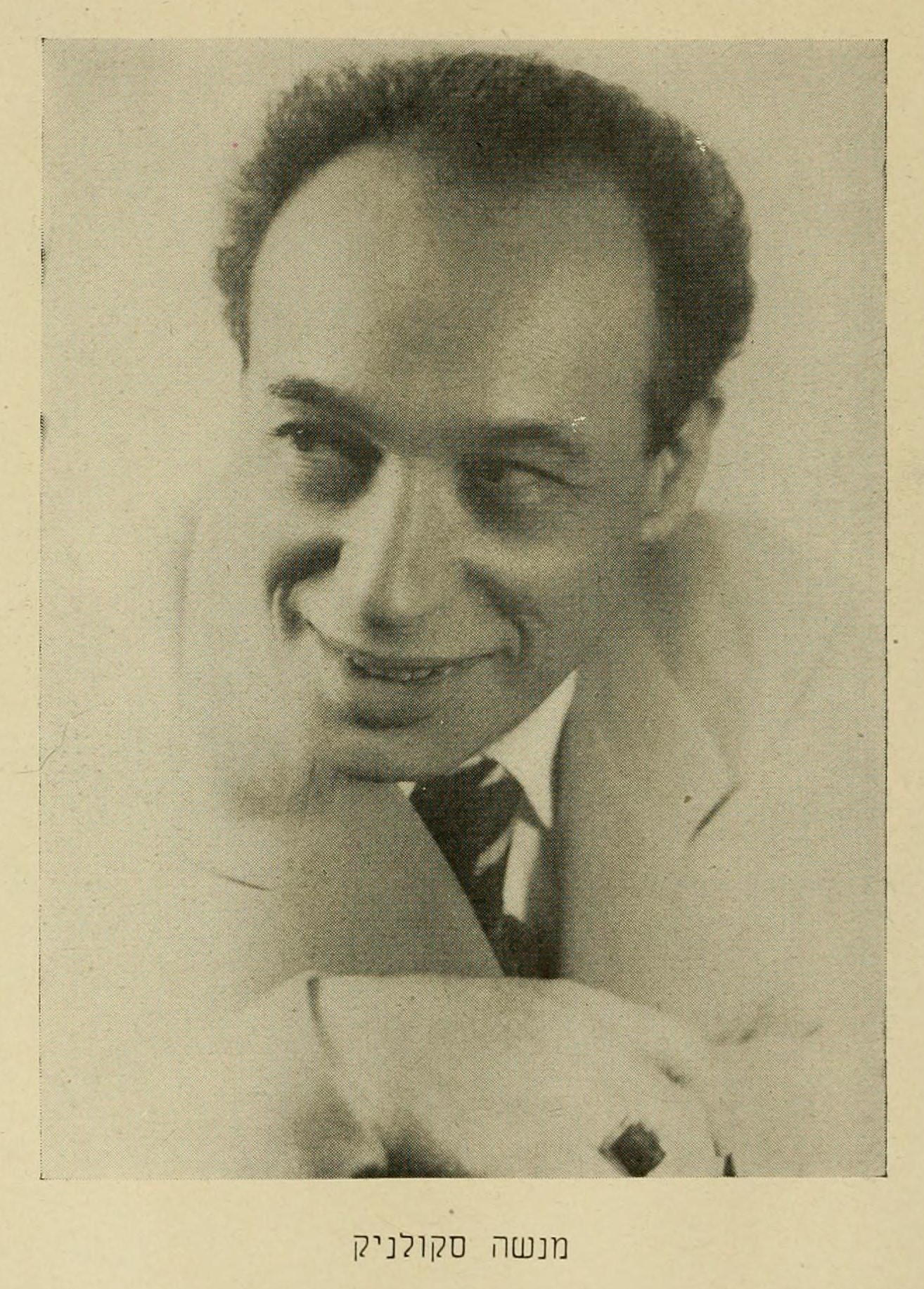
Menasha Skulnik, Yiddish theatre actor

Menasha Skulnik (Yiddish: מנשה סקולניק; May 15, 1890 – June 4, 1970) was an American actor, primarily known for his roles in Yiddish theater in New York City. Skulnik was also popular on radio, playing Uncle David on The Goldbergs for 19 years. He made many television and Broadway appearances as well, including successful runs in Clifford Odets's The Flowering Peach and Harold Rome's The Zulu and the Zayda.

== Life and career ==
Born in Warsaw, Poland, Skulnik reportedly ran away at the age of 10 to join a circus. In 1913 he immigrated to the United States, and sometime after his arrival joined a Yiddish stock company in Philadelphia, where his fellow actors included Molly Picon. His diminutive stature (5'4"), high nasal voice, mannerisms and appearance, made him a natural for comedy.

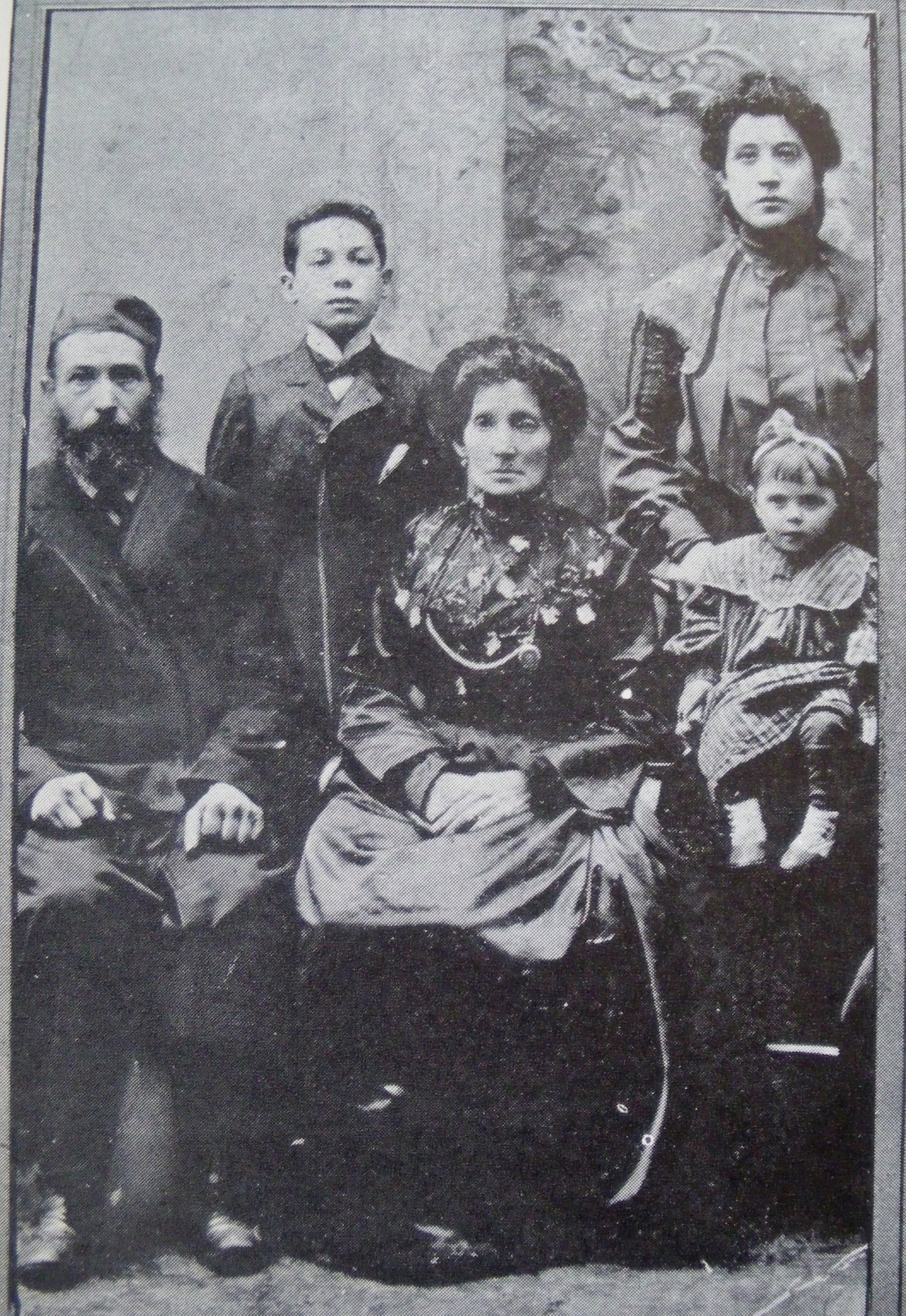
Menasha Skulnik and his parents and sisters

Skulnik knew exactly what he was in comedy: "I play a schlemiel, a dope. Sometimes they call me the Yiddish Charlie Chaplin, and I don't like this. Chaplin's dope is a little bit of a wiseguy. He's got a little larceny in him. I am a pure schlemiel, with no string attached." Skulnik was dubbed the "East Side's Chaplin" by the New York Evening Journal in 1935.

He collapsed on stage in New Haven, Connecticut, during a dress rehearsal of a show he was bringing to Broadway, and died several weeks later on June 4, 1970, in New York City. He is buried in the Yiddish theater section of the Mount Hebron Cemetery.

== Stage ==
- In a Tenement House (1932)
- God Man and Devil (1935)
- The Perfect Fishel (1935)
- Laugh Night (1936)
- Schlemihl (1936)
- Yossel and His Wives (1937)
- The Little Tailor (1938)
- The Wise Fool (1938)
- Mazel Tov, Rabbi (1938)
- Three Men and a Girl (1939)
- The Fifth Season (1953)
- The Flowering Peach (1954)
- Uncle Willie (1956)
- The 49th Cousin (1960)
- ’’La Belle’’ (1962)
- The Zulu and the Zayda (1965)
- Chu Chem (1966)

== Radio ==
- Abie's Irish Rose
- The Goldbergs

== Television ==
Menasha the Magnificent (1950)
