= Iggie Wolfington =

American actor (1919–2004)

- Born: Ignatius Wolfington; October 14, 1919; Philadelphia, Pennsylvania, US
- Died: September 30, 2004 (aged 84); Studio City, California, US
- Spouse: Lynn Wood (1972–2004)
- Awards: Screen Actors Guild Life Achievement Award (1984)

Ignatius "Iggie" Wolfington (October 14, 1919 – September 30, 2004) was an American actor. He originated the role of Marcellus Washburn in the Broadway musical The Music Man, which earned him a nomination for the 1958 Tony Award for Best Performance by a Featured Actor in a Musical.

== Early life ==
Wolfington was born in Philadelphia, Pennsylvania. He attended West Philadelphia Catholic High School, then studied at the Bessie V. Hicks School of Drama.

Wolfington served with distinction in the 102nd Infantry Division (United States) at the Battle of the Bulge during World War II. He received a battlefield commission as a first lieutenant. He was awarded the Silver Star for his role in saving thirty men. He also received the Purple Heart for wounds he received in battle. At his death he was buried with full military honors, at Arlington National Cemetery.

== Career ==
A life member of The Actors Studio, Wolfington is best known for originating the role of Marcellus Washburn in the Broadway musical The Music Man, starring Robert Preston, which earned Wolfington a nomination for the 1958 Tony Award for Best Performance by a Featured Actor in a Musical. Buddy Hackett was cast in the role for the 1962 movie version. In 1980, Wolfington appeared as Mayor Shinn in the short-lived, Off-Broadway revival of The Music Man, starring Dick Van Dyke. He also played the role of Chef Ellsworth in "Mrs. McThing", a 1952 play which featured Helen Hayes.

Wolfington worked in the earliest days of live television, then later became a familiar face on TV appearing in several popular programs including Gunsmoke (“Mad Dog”, 1967), Get Smart, The Andy Griffith Show, The Waltons, The Mary Tyler Moore Show, Fantasy Island, and The Rockford Files. He made a few television movies, and also appeared in TV commercials. Wolfington appeared in several motion pictures including Penelope (1966), Hex (1973), Herbie Rides Again (1974), The Strongest Man in the World (1975), Telefon (1977) and 1941 (1979).

== Labor union officer ==
For many years, Wolfington was a council member of the Actors' Equity Association, a New York City-based labor union for stage actors. In 1969, he saw the need for a West Coast office of the Actors' Fund of America to provide medical and financial assistance to actors beyond New York. Until that time, stage actors outside of New York had experienced difficulty securing adequate support from the headquarters there. Wolfington handled over 10,000 cases in the fifteen years preceding his 2004 death in Studio City, California.

== Personal life ==
In 1972, Wolfington married actress Lynn Wood.

== Filmography ==
Year	Title	Role	Notes
1966	Penelope	Store Owner	
1973	Hex	Bandmaster	
1974	Herbie Rides Again	Lawyer - Second Team	
1975	The Strongest Man in the World	Mr. Becker	
1977	Telefon	Father Stuart Diller	
1979	1941	Meyer Mishkin	
1988	Daddy's Boys	Marriage Licensor	

== Awards ==
Wolfington received the following awards:

- Screen Actors Guild Life Achievement Award
- Philip Loeb Humanitarian Award
- Los Angeles Drama Critics Circle Award

Awards
Preceded by Ralph Bellamy	Screen Actors Guild Life Achievement Award; 1984	Succeeded by Paul Newman & Joanne Woodward
