= William Ross (theatrical producer) =

William Ross, a prominent producer and stage manager on Broadway, was born in New York City on 5 September 1915 and died 23 August 1994. He served as vice president of the Actors' Equity Association and the first president of the Stage Managers' Association. He was recipient of the Philip Loeb Humanitarian Award and the Paul Robeson Award for his work in racial integration of stage casting.
