= Molly (1950 film) =

1950 film directed by Walter Hart

- Directed by: Walter Hart
- Written by: Gertrude Berg; N. Richard Nash
- Produced by: Mel Epstein
- Starring: Gertrude Berg; Philip Loeb; Eli Mintz; Eduard Franz; Larry Robinson; Arlene McQuade
- Cinematography: John F. Seitz
- Edited by: Ellsworth Hoagland
- Music by: Van Cleave
- Production company: Paramount Pictures
- Distributed by: Paramount Pictures
- Release date: December 23, 1950
- Running time: 83 minutes
- Country: United States
- Language: English

Molly (also known as The Goldbergs) is a 1950 American comedy film directed by Walter Hart and written by Gertrude Berg and N. Richard Nash. It is based on Berg's radio and television dramedy The Goldbergs, which aired from 1929 to 1956. The film stars Gertrude Berg, Philip Loeb, Eli Mintz, Eduard Franz, Larry Robinson and Arlene McQuade. It was released on December 23, 1950, by Paramount Pictures.

== Plot ==
Molly Goldberg welcomes an old beau to town, who is accompanied by his much younger fiancée. Molly invites her to join her evening music-appreciation classes, where the woman and the teacher exhibit a strong attraction to one another, leaving Molly to find ways to subtly intervene.

== Cast ==
- Gertrude Berg as Molly Goldberg
- Philip Loeb as Jake Goldberg
- Eli Mintz as Uncle David
- Eduard Franz as Alexander 'Abie' Abel
- Larry Robinson as Sammy Goldberg
- Arlene McQuade as Rosalie Goldberg
- Betty Walker as Mrs. Bertha Kramer
- Sarah Krohner as Tante Elka
- David Opatoshu as Mr. Dutton
- Barbara Rush as Debby Sherman
- Peter Hansen as Ted Gordon
- Helen Brown as Mrs. Morris
- Edit Angold as Mrs. Schiller
- Josephine Whittell as Mrs. Van Nest
- Shari Robinson as Nomi
- Ernő Verebes as Mr. Mendell

== Reception ==
In a contemporary review for The New York Times, critic Thomas M. Pryor wrote: "[T]he picture tells a simple story about wholesome, unsophisticated people who live a normal life and share all their joys and anxieties within the confines of our strongest bastion, the home. The Goldbergs, product of the Bronx, U. S. A., are the same sort of lovable, solid citizens on the screen as they have been on the radio for fifteen years and, more recently, on the stage and in television. ... A carping critic might observe that the film ... is no more than an animated transcription of a radio script, but why fly in the face of Molly's wonderful malapropisms?"

Critic Philip K. Scheuer of the Los Angeles Times wrote: "'Molly,'—as this frankly sentimental family saga is now called—is really one of the nicest pictures in months. Especially if you are receptive to a change of pace and willing to adapt yourself to a technique quite unabashedly that of the talkative TV screen. ... Molly's malapropisms gain, if anything, by issuing from the larger screen."
