= Gertrude Berg =

American actress, screenwriter and producer (1899–1966)

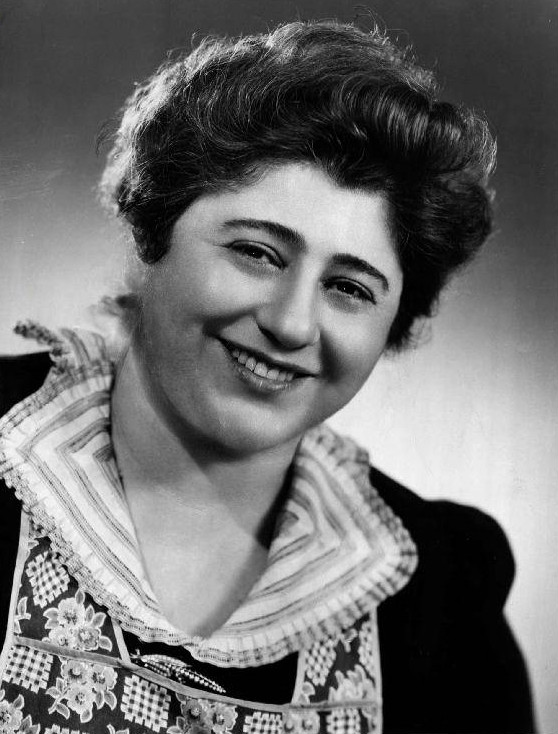
- Berg as Molly Goldberg in 1951
- Born: Tillie Edelstein; October 3, 1899; New York City, U.S.
- Died: September 14, 1966 (aged 66); New York City, U.S.
- Occupations: Actress, screenwriter
- Years active: 1929–1961
- Spouse: Lewis Berg (m. 1918)
- Children: 2

Gertrude Berg (born Tillie Edelstein; October 3, 1899 – September 14, 1966) was an American actress, screenwriter, and producer. A pioneer of classic radio, she was one of the first women to create, write, produce, and star in a long-running hit when she premiered her serial comedy-drama The Rise of the Goldbergs (1929), later known as The Goldbergs. Her career achievements included winning a Tony Award and an Emmy Award, both for Best Lead Actress.

== Life and career ==
Berg was born Tillie Edelstein in 1899 in the East Harlem neighborhood of Manhattan, New York City, to Jacob and Dinah Edelstein, natives of Russia and England, respectively. Berg's chronically unstable mother Dinah, grieving over the death of her young son, experienced a series of nervous breakdowns and later died in a sanitarium.

Tillie, who lived with her family on Lexington Avenue, married Lewis Berg in 1918; they had two children, Cherney (1922–2003) and Harriet (1926–2003). She learned theater while producing skits at her father's Catskills Mountains resort in Fleischmanns, New York.

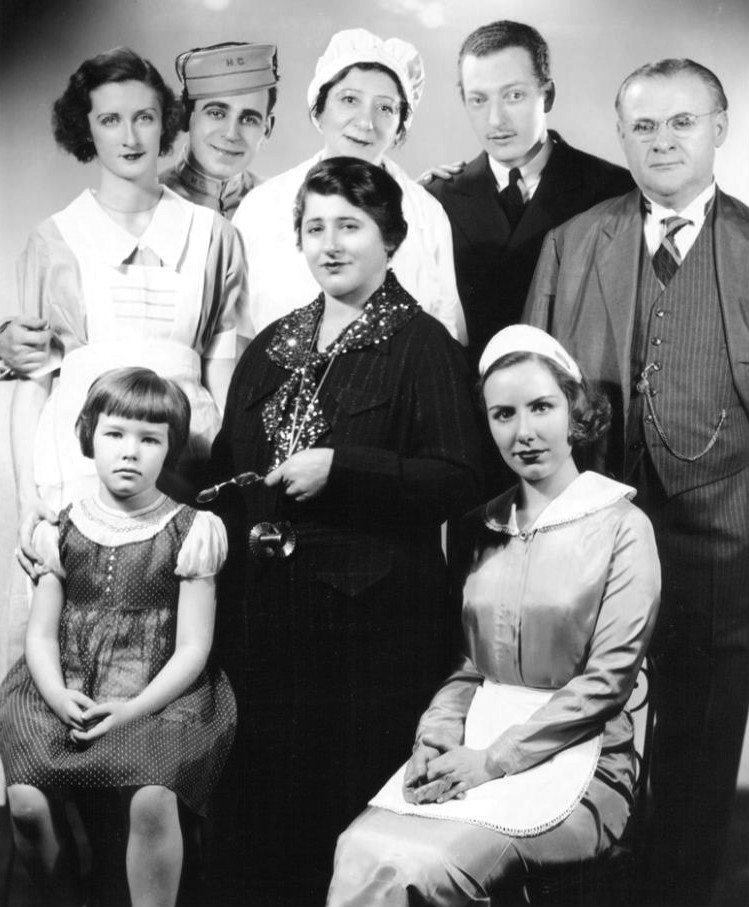
Berg was the author and lead actress of NBC's short-lived 1935 radio show House of Glass, in which she played a hotel owner.

After a fire burned down the sugar factory where her husband was employed, she worked on a semi-autobiographical skit that she hoped to develop into a radio program. It portrayed a Jewish family in a Bronx tenement. Though her household had a typewriter, Berg wrote the script by hand, taking the handwritten pages to a long-awaited appointment at NBC. When the executive she met with protested that he could not read her writing, she read the script aloud to him. Her performance not only sold the idea for the radio program, but also landed her the role as lead actress. She continued to write the scripts in pencil for as long as the program was on the air.

On November 20, 1929, a 15-minute episode of The Rise of the Goldbergs was first broadcast on the NBC radio network. She started at US$75 a week. Less than two years later, in the heart of the Great Depression, she let the sponsor propose a salary and was told, "Mrs. Berg, we can't pay a cent over $2,000 a week." Berg's husband, Lewis—who became a successful consulting engineer, though his job loss prompted her to write the initial radio script—refused to be photographed with his wife for publicity purposes, as he felt this was infringing on her success.

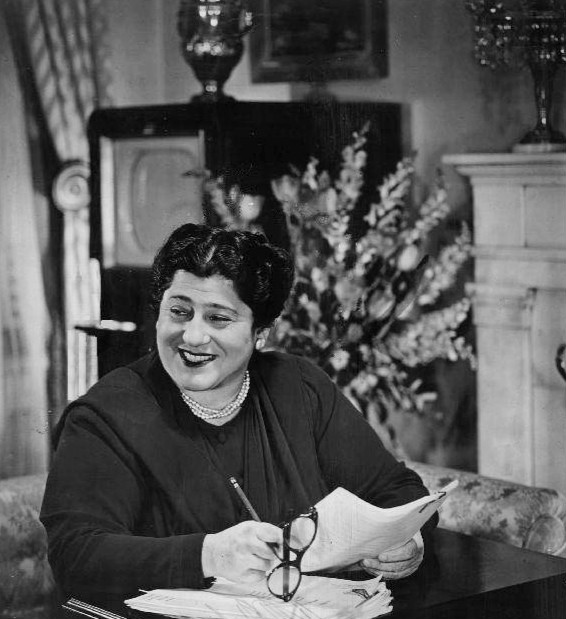
Berg working on television scripts by hand in pencil in 1950.

Berg became inextricably identified as Molly Goldberg, the big-hearted matriarch of her fictional Bronx family who moved to Connecticut as a symbol of upward mobility of American Jews. As Berg stated in her autobiography, she chose to depict her Jewish grandfather's worship in her initial radio broadcast show. She wrote nearly all of the radio episodes (more than 5,000) plus a Broadway adaptation, Me and Molly (1948). The Goldberg family struggles, and the portrayal of first-generation immigrants seeking to assimilate into American life, were relatable to many in the radio audience. Radio seemed to produce a common place to tie patriotism and families together. The program's success was largely because of the familiar feelings the scripts evoked in the American people. The scripts from the first season were later published in book form.

It took considerable convincing, but Berg finally prevailed upon CBS to let her bring The Goldbergs to television in 1949. It has since been credited with being the first TV sitcom. Early episodes portrayed the Goldberg family openly struggling to adapt to American life. Her characters Molly, Jake, Sammy and Rosie lived out the day-to-day stories of Jewish immigrants. In 1951, Berg won the first ever Emmy Award for Lead Actress in a Television Series in her twentieth year of playing the role. The show would stay in production for five more years.

The Goldbergs ran into political trouble in 1950 during the McCarthy Era. Co-star Philip Loeb (Molly's husband, patriarch Jake Goldberg) was one of the performers named in Red Channels: The Report of Communist Influence in Radio and Television, which resulted in his being blacklisted. The program's chief sponsor, General Foods, insisted that Loeb must be fired. Berg stuck by Loeb and resisted sponsor and network pressure for a year and a half. With Loeb still in the cast in 1951, General Foods cancelled its sponsorship, as did Sanka; CBS executives dropped The Goldbergs from their schedule in June 1951. The program was then picked up by NBC. In January 1952, Loeb resigned rather than cause Berg further problems.

Following the Loeb controversy, The Goldbergs continued on television until 1954, after which Berg also wrote and produced a syndicated film version. The show remained in syndicated reruns for another few years, after one year of production and 39 episodes (it aired on some stations as Molly). A new version of the series is currently seen on the Jewish Life Television (JLTV) cable network.

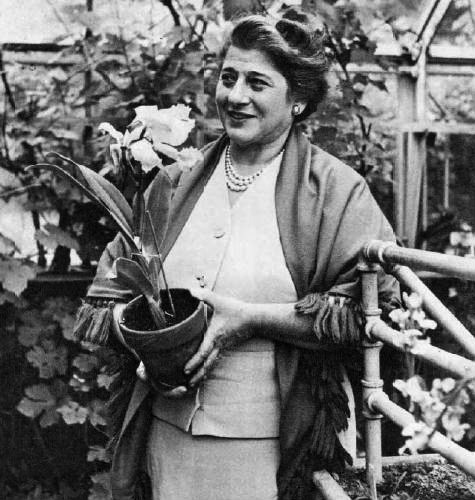
Berg with orchids in the greenhouse of her summer home, 1954.

Berg made guest appearances on television in the 1950s and early 1960s. She appeared on The Pat Boone Chevy Showroom, on a February 1958 episode of The Ford Show, Starring Tennessee Ernie Ford, and was the "mystery guest'" on the series What's My Line? in 1954, 1960, and 1961. In 1961, she made a last stab at television success in the Four Star Television situation comedy, Mrs. G. Goes to College (retitled The Gertrude Berg Show at midseason), playing a 62-year-old widow who enrolls in college. The series was cancelled after one season.

Berg continued working in theatre through these years. In 1959, she won the Tony Award for Best Actress for her performance in A Majority of One. In 1961, she won the Sarah Siddons Award for her work in Chicago theater. She also published a best-selling memoir, Molly and Me, in 1961.

In 1965 she released an album, How to Be a Jewish Mother, on the Amy Records label. A spoken-word adaptation of humorist Dan Greenburg's best-selling 1964 book of the same name, the album peaked at No. 131 on the Billboard Top LPs, during a twelve-week stay on the chart.

== Death and legacy ==
Berg died of heart failure on September 14, 1966, aged 66, at Doctors Hospital in Manhattan. She is buried at Clovesville Cemetery in Fleischmanns, New York.

A biography of Berg, Something on My Own: Gertrude Berg and American Broadcasting, 1929–1956, by Glenn D. Smith, Jr. (Syracuse University Press) appeared in 2007. Aviva Kempner's 2009 documentary, Yoo-Hoo, Mrs. Goldberg, deals with Berg's career, and, to an extent, her personal life.
