= Esther Kim Varet =

American art dealer and gallerist

- Born: Esther Jin Kim; Texas, U.S.
- Education: Yale University (BA); Columbia University (MA)
- Spouse: Joseph Varet (m. 2011)
- Website: Campaign website

Esther Jin Kim Varet is an American art dealer and gallerist, best known as the founder and director of the contemporary art gallery Various Small Fires (VSF) in Los Angeles. She established VSF in 2012 as a project space in her home and has grown it into a gallery with locations in Los Angeles and Orange County. Kim Varet has been noted as a prominent figure in the L.A. art scene, credited with launching the careers of several artists and drawing institutional attention to her gallery's program. In 2025, she announced a campaign for a seat in the U.S. Congress, running as a Democrat in California's 40th congressional district. During the election cycle, the seat underwent dramatic changes due to the passage of Prop 50. In the primary, the Democratic art gallery owner placed first amongst Democrats, but placed third behind the Republican incumbent Reps. Ken Calvert of Corona and Young Kim of Anaheim Hills.

== Early life and education ==
Kim Varet grew up in Dallas, Texas. Her parents, Chang and Susan Kim, immigrated from South Korea shortly before she was born. She attended Trinity Christian Academy from kindergarten through high school. During her childhood, she spent summers in Seoul, South Korea.

She attended Yale University as an undergraduate; after graduating from Yale, she worked briefly at New York art galleries including Paula Cooper Gallery and Petzel Gallery. She then pursued graduate studies in the history department of art and archaeology at Columbia University, where she wrote her master's thesis on performance artist Andrea Fraser's institutional critique. While in graduate school, Kim Varet started a Ph.D. program at Columbia University in modern and postmodern cultural studies but eventually shifted focus toward an opportunity in the art business.

== Career ==
In 2012, Kim Varet and her husband, Joseph Varet, opened Various Small Fires as an informal art project space out of their residence in Venice Beach, Los Angeles. The gallery started on the ground floor of their home, where she hosted shows by emerging artists, before the couple invested in a dedicated gallery property in Hollywood in 2015. Joseph Varet, an entrepreneur with a background in finance, took on the role of managing VSF's business operations, allowing Esther to concentrate on curating, talent management, dealing, and business expansion.

Following the success of the Los Angeles gallery, Kim Varet expanded VSF to additional cities. The gallery opened a Seoul, South Korea branch in 2019, followed by a Dallas, Texas location in 2022. In April 2025, she launched a new outpost in Orange County, California (VSF OC), with an inaugural exhibition in Tustin. Kim Varet has emphasized creating "community safe spaces" at each gallery location, with programming inclusive of diverse artists and audiences. The name Various Small Fires itself, taken from a 1964 artist's book by Ed Ruscha, reflected her intention to operate in multiple locations from the outset.

VSF under Kim Varet's direction is known for its multigenerational roster of artists and for elevating emerging talent. W Magazine reported in 2023 that she had "helped launch the careers" of artists such as painter Jessie Homer French, textile artist Diedrick Brackens, and artist Dyani White Hawk, who later received a MacArthur "genius grant" in 2023.

Kim Varet's approach to gallery management has been described as highly strategic and systematized. She developed a comprehensive operations manual for VSF (nearly 100 pages long) to standardize practices and enable the gallery's replication in new markets.

The art-dealer Soojin, portrayed by Greta Lee on the HBO series Girls, was reportedly inspired by Kim Varet's early career in New York.

== Political candidacy ==
In early 2025, Kim Varet publicly entered politics by declaring her candidacy for the United States House of Representatives. She announced she would run as a Democrat in California's 40th Congressional District, aiming to unseat incumbent Republican Congresswoman Young Kim in the 2026 election. Kim Varet has framed her run as an extension of her community engagement, drawing on her art-world fundraising experience to build a political campaign network. Kim Varet has indicated that her decision to run was driven by concern for democratic institutions under the Trump administration and a desire to bring fresh perspectives, including those of the arts community, into government. Kim Varet finished first amongst Democratic challengers, but she was ultimately eliminated in California’s Top 2 jungle primary allowing the two Republican incumbents Young Kim and Ken Calvert to advance to the general.

== Personal life ==
Kim Varet married Joseph Rosenwald Varet, a co-founder of LXTV and former MTV executive, in 2011, after the two met through their support of Performa. They have a son, Julius, and a daughter, Zelda. Varet is the son of Elizabeth Rosenwald Varet, the former chair of American Securities who is the granddaughter of Julius Rosenwald, daughter of William Rosenwald, and sister of Nina Rosenwald.
