= Rosenwald =

Rosenwald is a surname. Notable people with the surname include:

- Cindy Rosenwald (born 1954), American politician
- Harold Rosenwald (c. 1908–1990), American lawyer
- James B. Rosenwald (born 1958), American businessman
- Julius Rosenwald (1862–1932), American businessman and philanthropist
- Lessing J. Rosenwald (1891–1979), American businessman and rare book collector
- Laurie Rosenwald (born 1955), American illustrator, author, artist and designer
- Lindsay Rosenwald, American businessman
- Nina Rosenwald, American political activist and philanthropist
- William Rosenwald (1903–1996), American businessman and philanthropist
