= Armand Deutsch =

American film producer (1913–2005)

Armand S. Deutsch
- Born: January 25, 1913; Chicago, Illinois, U.S.
- Died: August 13, 2005 (aged 92); Los Angeles, California, U.S.
- Other name: Ardie
- Occupation: Film producer
- Years active: 1950–1958
- Spouses: Benay Venutal (m. 1939; div. 1950) Harriet Deutsch (m. 1951)
- Children: 6
- Relatives: Julius Rosenwald (grandfather); Lessing J. Rosenwald (uncle); William Rosenwald (uncle); Edgar B. Stern Sr. (uncle); Edith Rosenwald Stern (aunt); Nina Rosenwald (cousin)

Armand Deutsch (January 25, 1913 – August 13, 2005) was an American film producer and grandson of philanthropist and Sears CEO Julius Rosenwald. He believed that he was the intended target of the thrill killers Leopold and Loeb, who went on to kidnap and murder his schoolmate Robert "Bobby" Franks in 1924.

== Early life and education ==
Deutsch was born on January 25, 1913, in Chicago, Illinois, to Armand and Adele Deutsch Levy (née Rosenwald). His mother was Jewish. Deutsch's parents married in 1911. They divorced before 1927 whereupon his mother married Dr David M Levy, a child psychologist and moved to New York City to pursue a long and notable career in philanthropy. Adele was among the founders of The Citizen's Committee for Children and was a member of the executive committee of the United Jewish Appeal's fundraising for survivors of the Holocaust in 1947.

Deutsch's younger brother Richard E. Deutsch was born in 1917. Armand attended The University of Chicago.

== Personal life ==
Deutsch and actress Benay Venuta married in 1939. Maintaining a home in Palm Springs, California, they had two daughters, Patty and Deborah, and divorced in 1950. Deutsch's second marriage to Harriet Berk Simon, widow of S. Sylvan Simon, in 1951 ended with his death. They had four children together.

Known as "a friendly and unobtrusive fellow," Deutsch had many famous and influential friends, including William Goetz, Frank Sinatra, Jack Benny, and United States President Ronald Reagan and First Lady Nancy Reagan, both of whom he met before the two married. He remained their close friend throughout Reagan's time as governor and president. In 1981, Reagan appointed Deutsch to the Presidential Task Force on the Arts & Humanities, which was established to recommend ways that both private and federal support for the arts and humanities could be enhanced.

Deutsch died in Los Angeles of complications relating to pneumonia at Cedars-Sinai Medical Center, where he was a board member and trustee for many years.

== Career ==
Deutsch spent his youth in New York City, where he knew Truman Capote, and served in the US Navy during World War II. After service he moved to Los Angeles at the invitation of Metro-Goldwyn-Mayer chief of production Dore Schary to become a film producer. His credits include The Magnificent Yankee, a biopic of Oliver Wendell Holmes, which was nominated for two Academy Awards: Best Actor for Louis Calhern and Best Costume Design.

== Leopold and Loeb ==
Deutsch claimed that, as an 11-year-old in 1924, he may have been the intended target of the thrill killers Leopold and Loeb, who went on to kidnap and murder his schoolmate, Robert "Bobby" Franks. Writing in the Chicago Tribune in 1996, he stated that he avoided his brush with death as rather than walking home from school, he was driven to a dentist appointment by his chauffeur:

It was no mystery why Richard Loeb and Nathan Leopold had singled me out as a prime prospect for their heinous crime. My grandfather, Julius Rosenwald, was the chairman of the board of Sears, Roebuck and Co. His prominence made me an ideal choice. In addition, Loeb's father was a Sears vice president. Our families were friends...So I knew and trusted both older boys, a great plus as they formulated their plans for what would become the first "crime of the century."

== Producer credits ==
- Ambush (1950)
- Right Cross (1950)
- The Magnificent Yankee (1950)
- Three Guys Named Mike (1951)
- Kind Lady (1951)
- Carbine Williams (1952)
- So Bright the Flame (1952) (original title The Girl in White)
- The Girl Who Had Everything (1953)
- Green Fire (1954)
- Slander (1957)
- Saddle the Wind (1958)

== Memoir ==
Deutsch's memoir Me and Bogie: And Other Friends and Acquaintances from a Life in Hollywood and Beyond was published in 1991.
