= Picture Show (magazine) =

British film magazine (1919–1960)

- Cover April 1955: Grace Kelly & Stewart Granger in Green Fire
- Categories: Film
- Frequency: Weekly
- First issue: May 3, 1919; 107 years ago
- Final issue: December 31, 1960; 65 years ago
- Company: Amalgamated Press/Fleetway Publications
- Country: United Kingdom

Picture Show was a weekly film magazine, published in the United Kingdom between 3 May 1919 and 31 December 1960. It was one of the longest-running film entertainment magazines in Britain.

== Overview ==
Picture Show was launched in 1919. It was published throughout its run by the Amalgamated Press/Fleetway Publications as a weekly magazine. In 1939 it absorbed another film magazine, Film Pictorial. In 1959 it absorbed TV Mirror. Its publishers also produced the Picture Show Annual throughout its run.

== See also ==
- Picturegoer
