= Various Small Fires =

Various Small Fires may refer to:

- Various Small Fires, a 2010 album by singer-songwriter Paris Wells
- Various Small Fires (gallery), a contemporary art gallery in Los Angeles, US
