= Rosenwald (disambiguation) =

Rosenwald is a surname. It may also refer to:

- Mount Rosenwald, Queen Maud Mountains, Antarctica
- Rosenwald Building, Albuquerque, New Mexico, former department store on the National Register of Historic Places
- Rosenwald (film), a 2015 documentary

== School buildings ==
- Rosenwald School (Delight, Arkansas), on the National Register of Historic Places
- Rosenwald High School (Panama City, Florida)
- Rosenwald High School (New Roads, Louisiana), a former school
- Rosenwald Hall, Dillard University, New Orleans, Louisiana

== See also ==
- Rosenwald School, a name given to thousands of schools, shops, and teachers' homes in the United States which were built primarily for the education of African-American children in the South in the early 20th century
- Rosenwald Fund
