= Childcare Expo =

UK trade show

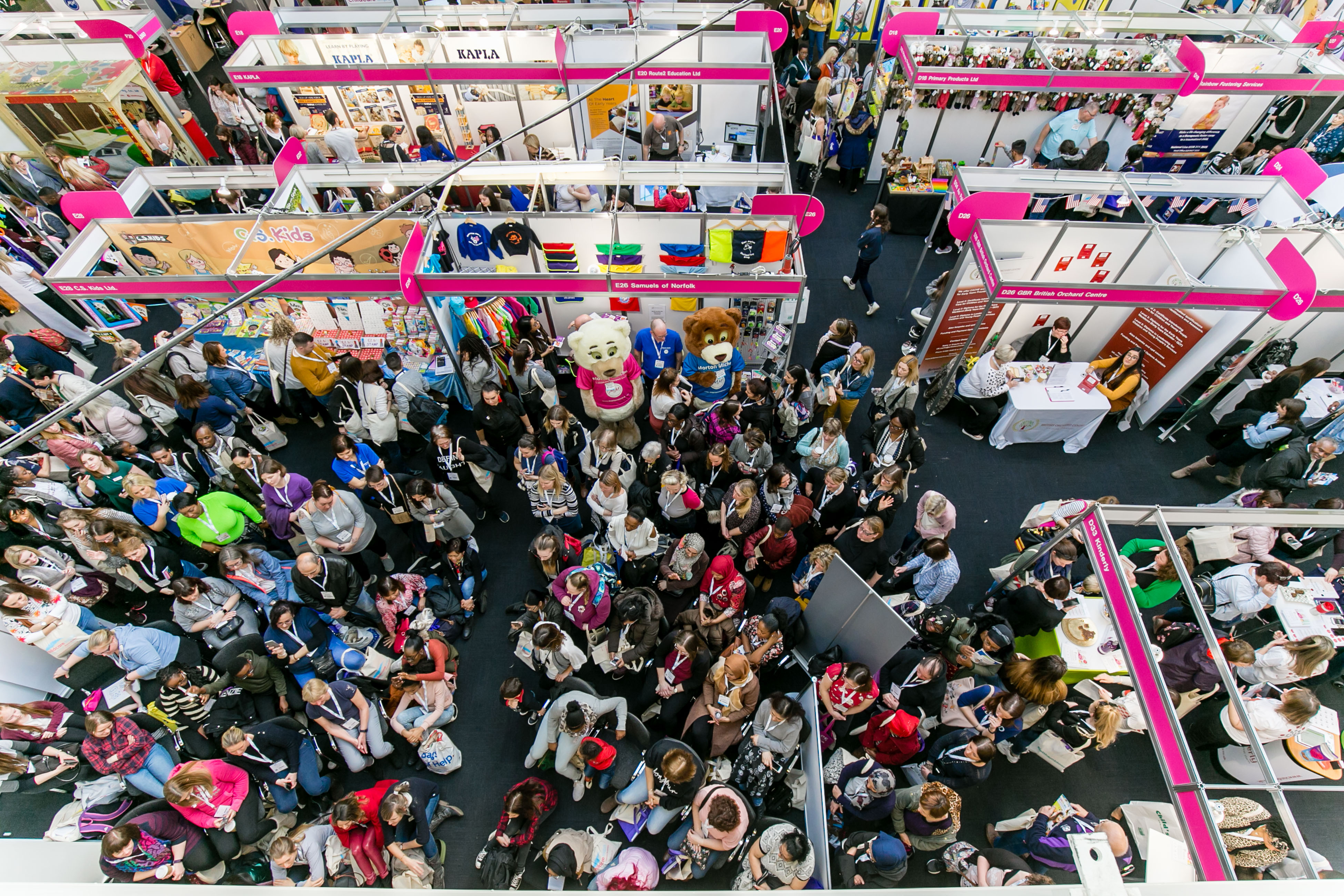
Visitors from Childcare & Education Expo London gather round the workshop area to participate

Childcare & Education Expo is a national exhibition in the UK for members of the primary, early years, and nursery sectors. The trade show takes place three times a year in March, June and September and is held at the Olympia London, EventCity in Manchester and the Ricoh Arena in Coventry. It brings together educational products and services and provides visitors with advice and information regarding industry changes.

== History ==
Childcare & Education Expo was established in 2010 and not only attracted visitors from across the UK but also from Ireland, Jordan, Dubai and Australia. The first show hosted over 90 exhibitors and was opened by Dr Rosemary Leonard. The exhibitors ranged from software companies to toy specialists. The show also includes a variety of educational seminars to help nursery owners, managers and childminders to develop their businesses as well as engaging workshops brought to you by educational leaders in the sector.

== Guests ==
Special guests for the event include C'Beebies Sid Sloane, CBBC presenter Dave Benson-Phillips and expert & best-selling author on baby food & nutrition, Annabel Karmel.

Childcare & Education Expo returns in 2020 with three brand new dates that can be viewed on the website. The event is free to attend and seminars can be booked before the event or on the day.

== See also ==
- Learning Care Group
- Busy Bees Nurseries
