= North Shore Historic District =

North Shore Historic District may refer to:

in the United States (by state)

- North Shore Historic District (Miami Beach, Florida), listed on the National Register of Historic Places (NRHP) in Florida
- North Shore Historic District (St. Petersburg, Florida), listed on the NRHP in Florida
- Kaua'i Belt Road-North Shore section, Princeville, HI, a historic district listed on the NRHP on Kauai, Hawaii
- North Shore Sanitary District Tower, Highland Park, IL, listed on the NRHP in Illinois
