= Nina Rosenwald =

American activist and philanthropist

- Education: Sarah Lawrence College (B.A.); New York University (M.A.)
- Organization(s): William Rosenwald Family Fund; Gatestone Institute; Sears Roebuck; American Securities Management
- Parent: William Rosenwald
- Relatives: Julius Rosenwald (grandfather); Lessing J. Rosenwald (uncle); Edith Rosenwald Stern (aunt); Edgar B. Stern (uncle); Armand Deutsch (cousin)

Nina Rosenwald is an American political activist and philanthropist. An heiress to the Sears Roebuck fortune, Rosenwald is vice president of the William Rosenwald Family Fund and co-chair of the board of American Securities Management. She is the founder and president of Gatestone Institute, a New York-based right-wing think tank.

A descendant of philanthropists and Jewish refugees from Eastern Europe, Rosenwald has focused on donating to pro-Israel organizations.

== Family ==
Born and raised in New York City, Rosenwald is one of three daughters of William Rosenwald and Mary Kurtz Rosenwald. Her sisters are Elizabeth R. Varet and Alice Rosenwald.

Rosenwald's grandfather, Julius Rosenwald, was an early investor in Sears, Roebuck & Company, and served as president of the company from 1908 to 1924. Thereafter, until his death in January 1932, he served as chairman. In 1912, he partnered with Booker T. Washington and the Tuskegee Normal and Industrial Institute (later Tuskegee University) to build more than 5,000 schoolhouses for African-American children throughout the South.

Rosenwald's father moved from Chicago to New York City in the early 1930s and was chairman of the investment firm American Securities. In 1939, he was one of three founding members of the United Jewish Appeal (UJA). Rosenwald's mother, a professional violinist, was a refugee from both the Russian Revolution and Nazi Germany.

== Education ==
Rosenwald received a B.A. from Sarah Lawrence College in Yonkers, New York, and her M.A. in English from New York University in New York City.

== Political activism ==
Rosenwald's political activism began in the 1970s in support of Senator Henry M. "Scoop" Jackson. She also supported the campaigns of Senator Daniel Patrick Moynihan, serving for many years on his campaign finance committee. In 1984, Rosenwald was appointed to the Rules Committee of the Democratic National Convention in San Francisco, and she served as a delegate from New York at the 1996 Democratic National Convention.

According to the Militarist Monitor website, formerly known as "Right Web", Rosenwald's donations to pro-Israel organizations have "earned her a place of considerable influence in the 'pro-Israel' firmament". She has served on the board of directors of many pro-Israel organizations, including Washington Institute for Near East Policy (WINEP), the American Israel Public Affairs Committee (AIPAC) and the Hudson Institute and was vice president of Jewish Institute for National Security Affairs (JINSA). In 2003, she was a recipient of the Louis Brandeis Award, given by the Zionist Organization of America for her pro-Israel advocacy.

Apart from founding the Gatestone Institute and serving as its president, she also serves on the boards of Human Rights in China, the Middle East Forum, the Committee for Accuracy in Middle East Reporting in America (CAMERA), the National Committee on American Foreign Policy, the Institute for National Security Studies and the American Friends of the Open University of Israel, which raises funds to expand access to higher education for all Israelis, including Muslims, Christians and Jews.

She is a member of the Council on Foreign Relations, a founding member of the Board of Regents for the Center for Security Policy, and a former board member of the American Israel Public Affairs Committee (AIPAC). In 2011, she was a guest member at AIPAC's Gala event.

Her family fund has given financial support to two institutions located in settlements on the West Bank: the Beit El Yeshiva and Ariel University. It also donates to the Central Fund of Israel, a New-York-based NGO which reportedly serves as a major vehicle for the transfer of American donations to "hard-core" settlements on the West Bank.

Rosenwald resigned from the board of Freedom House in 2007, arguing that it had changed radically and was over-reliant on public largesse and government funding. Rather than a "voice for freedom", she maintained, it had become "very little more than a Beltway bandit". In 2007, The Washington Post listed Rosenwald as one of the "people of means and influence" who raised money to lobby President Bush to pardon Scooter Libby.

According to Max Blumenthal of The Nation, Rosenwald has donated over $2.8 million to the following organizations since 2000: the Gatestone Institute, the Center for Security Policy, Project ijtihad, the American Islamic Forum for Democracy, the Middle East Forum, the Clarion Fund, Commentary magazine and the Hudson Institute. The Middle East Forum received $2.3 million from Rosenwald over a ten-year period ending in 2012. Rosenwald has also given money to David Horowitz and Brigitte Gabriel. She has also been described as a counter-jihad "elite".

Some Muslims have disputed the allegation of Islamophobia. When criticized by the Council on American–Islamic Relations (CAIR) for making 2013 contributions in excess of $1,000,000 to "Islamophobic groups", prominent Muslims affiliated with the Gatestone Institute, including Zuhdi Jasser, former Lieutenant Commander in the United States Navy and founder and president of the American Islamic Forum for Democracy (AIFD), came to her defense. Jasser said:

It goes without saying, but to those who may not know Nina, and having known her now for many years, it is clear to me that she has the highest respect for Muslims who love their faith, love God, and take seriously our Islamic responsibility to defeat the global jihad and its Islamist inspiration.

In response to anti-Muslim allegations made by the Council on American-Islamic Relations (CAIR) toward Rosenwald, writer and film maker Raheel Raza said, "If Muslims guided by CAIR could take the time to read and reflect on efforts of people like Nina, they would broaden their horizons and gain a lot of insights into the betterment of Muslims."
