= Giant Bible of Mainz =

Manuscript bible

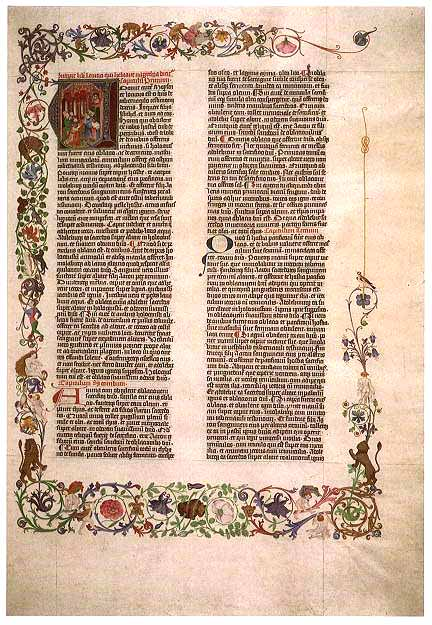
A page from the Giant Bible of Mainz

The Giant Bible of Mainz is a very large manuscript Bible produced in 1452–53, probably in Mainz or nearby. It is notable for its beauty, for being one of the last manuscript Bibles written before the invention of printing in the West, and for its possible connections with the Gutenberg Bible.

== Place and date of production ==
The Bible's colophon records that the scribe began work on April 4, 1452, and finished on July 9, 1453. Around this time large Bibles, designed to be read from a lectern, were returning to popularity for the first time since the twelfth century. In the intervening period, small hand-held Bibles had been usual.

Although the place of production cannot be known with certainty, several pieces of evidence link it to Mainz, including the style of decoration. The style of the script also suggests an origin somewhere in the Middle or Lower Rhine region, and the Bible is known to have been owned by Mainz Cathedral from at least 1566.

== Description ==
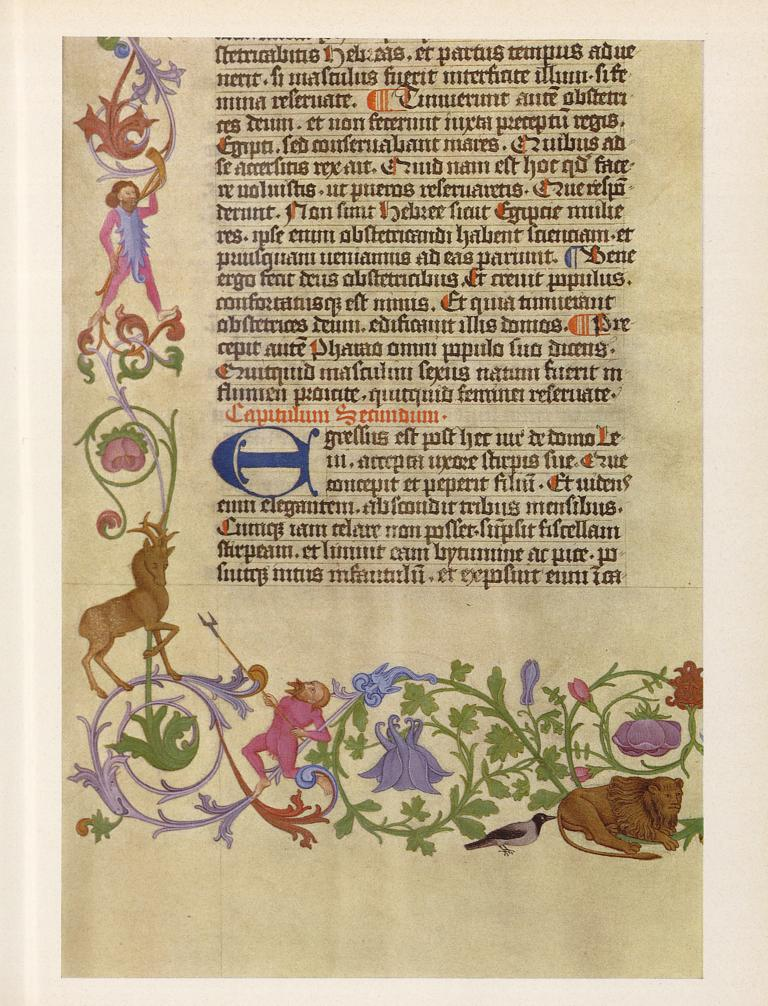
Detail of another page

The Bible was written by a single scribe on parchment of high quality. The pages measure 576 x 405mm (22.6 x 15.9in) and the text is arranged in two columns of 60 lines, with wide margins. There are decorations in a range of styles, by more than one artist. The decoration was never completed, for unknown reasons. Only a few pages in the first volume have the complex and finely drawn illuminated borders the Bible is known for.

The Bible is bound in two volumes, with 244 leaves in the first and 214 in the second. It is likely that one preliminary and two end leaves are missing. The binding is of plain pigskin over wooden boards and is more or less contemporary with the rest of the book. The text block is secured by nine cords with head and tail bands of red, white, and green silk.

The text of the Bible has been little-studied but is close to other Vulgate Bibles of the period.

== Owners ==
The provenance of the Bible is known from 1566 onward. In that year Heinrich von Stockheim of Mainz Cathedral deposited it in the cathedral library. It is unclear whether he was donating it to the cathedral or simply transferring it to the library from the chantry. In 1631 the library was seized as a prize of war by Gustavus Adolphus II of Sweden, who gave the Bible to one of his officers, Bernard of Saxe-Weimar. It remained in Bernard's family until sold to Lessing J. Rosenwald, via the bookseller Hans P. Kraus, in 1951. In 1952 Rosenwald donated it to the Library of Congress.

The Bible is in very good condition, suggesting that it was never regularly read. There are no thumb-marks and very little discoloration to the outer margins. It was foliated in the nineteenth century.

== Relationship to Gutenberg Bible ==
The Giant Bible was written at the same time as Johannes Gutenberg was printing his Bible, and possibly in the same town. The Gutenberg Bible was clearly modelled on the large-format manuscript Bibles being written at this time, for instance in its page size and its wide margins. There has been speculation that the Giant Bible was a particular influence on Gutenberg, but the evidence for this is limited. Gutenberg's typeface is in the same textura style, but it does not seem that the hand of the Giant Bible's scribe was the model for it. The text of the Giant Bible is not especially close to the Gutenberg Bible.

Several animals, humans, and flowers featured in the decorated borders added to some pages closely resemble figures in the Princeton University copy of the Gutenberg Bible and also in the work of the Master of the Playing Cards. It is assumed that the same model book was used in each case. There has been speculation that the Master of the Playing Cards worked on the Giant Bible, and may also have been an associate of Gutenberg, though there is no hard evidence. The Princeton copy of the Gutenberg Bible seems to have been decorated by a different artist than the Giant Bible.
