= The Girl Who Had Everything =

1953 film by Richard Thorpe

- Theatrical Film Poster
- Directed by: Richard Thorpe
- Written by: Play: Willard Mack
- Screenplay by: Art Cohn
- Based on: A Free Soul; 1927 novel by Adela Rogers St. Johns
- Produced by: Armand Deutsch
- Starring: Elizabeth Taylor; Fernando Lamas; William Powell
- Cinematography: Paul C. Vogel
- Edited by: Ben Lewis
- Music by: André Previn
- Distributed by: Metro-Goldwyn-Mayer
- Release date: March 27, 1953 (U.S.)
- Running time: 69 minutes
- Country: United States
- Language: English
- Budget: $665,000
- Box office: $1,218,000

The Girl Who Had Everything is a 1953 American romantic drama film directed by Richard Thorpe and produced by Armand Deutsch for Metro-Goldwyn-Mayer. The film features William Powell in his last MGM feature and one of his last film roles before retirement.

The screenplay was written by Art Cohn based upon a 1928 play by Willard Mack and the 1927 novel A Free Soul by Adela Rogers St. Johns. The play and novel were also the inspiration for an earlier film adaptation titled A Free Soul (1931).

== Plot ==
Jean Latimer lives with her widowed father, defense lawyer Steve Latimer, who had recently agreed to defend gambler Victor Ramondi against charges of gambling and organized crime. Prior to the trial, Jean's long-term boyfriend Vance Court proposes marriage, but she demurs.

During the trial, Jean meets Victor and they immediately have undeniable chemistry on their first date. Jean confides in Victor that she is worried about her father's alcoholism. Although Victor presents himself in a gentlemanly manner to Jean, she is intrigued by Victor's dark side. Victor outbids Vance in an auction for an expensive colt that he later offers to Jean as a gift.

Steve is aware of Victor's tricks and deceitfulness, and he warns Jean. However, she continues to pursue Victor. She agrees to take a short vacation with Steve in order to clear her head. However, after only a few days, she cannot handle the separation from Victor and soon departs for New York to see him.

Upon arrival in New York, Victor sees a newspaper article describing that the trials against him may reopen following the discovery of classified information provided by a mystery witness, later revealed to be Steve. Victor is enraged, knowing that Steve has the power to expose his crimes, ruining both his reputation and his chances with Jean. The two men threaten each other in a heated argument. While Steve cannot directly testify against Victor in court, he threatens to call witnesses who can attest to Victor's murder of two mobsters. Victor threatens Steve with physical harm if he should travel to Washington to testify. In his anger, Victor strikes both Steve and Jean. Despite Victor's subsequent apology, Jean finally realizes that her father was correct about Victor and cancels the engagement.

Victor departs, and while he is stopped at a traffic light in his car, he is shot and killed by a man in an adjacent truck. When reporters seek interviews the following day, Steve characterizes Victor as a gambler who lost his own game. Jean and Steve reconcile and embrace.

== Cast ==
Actor	Role
Elizabeth Taylor	Jean Latimer
Fernando Lamas	Victor Y. Ramondi
William Powell	Steve Latimer
Gig Young	Vance Court
James Whitmore	Charles "Chico" Menlow
William Walker	Julian
Emory Parnell	Horse Auctioneer
Robert Burton	John Ashmond

== Reception ==
In a contemporary review, critic Marjory Adams of The Boston Globe wrote: "From an audience viewpoint, the story doesn't live up to the title. It's only a fairly average film, with a lot of phony sentiment and situations which are, to be perfectly frank, so trite that at times they border on caricature." However, Adams praised the film's wardrobe, adding: "So you can feast your eyes on the cinema style show and forget some of that awful dialogue. It's too bad the film wasn't done in color."

According to MGM records, the film earned $739,000 in the U.S. and Canada and $479,000 elsewhere, resulting in a profit of $116,000.
