= Raymond Ibrahim =

American critic of Islam (1973-)

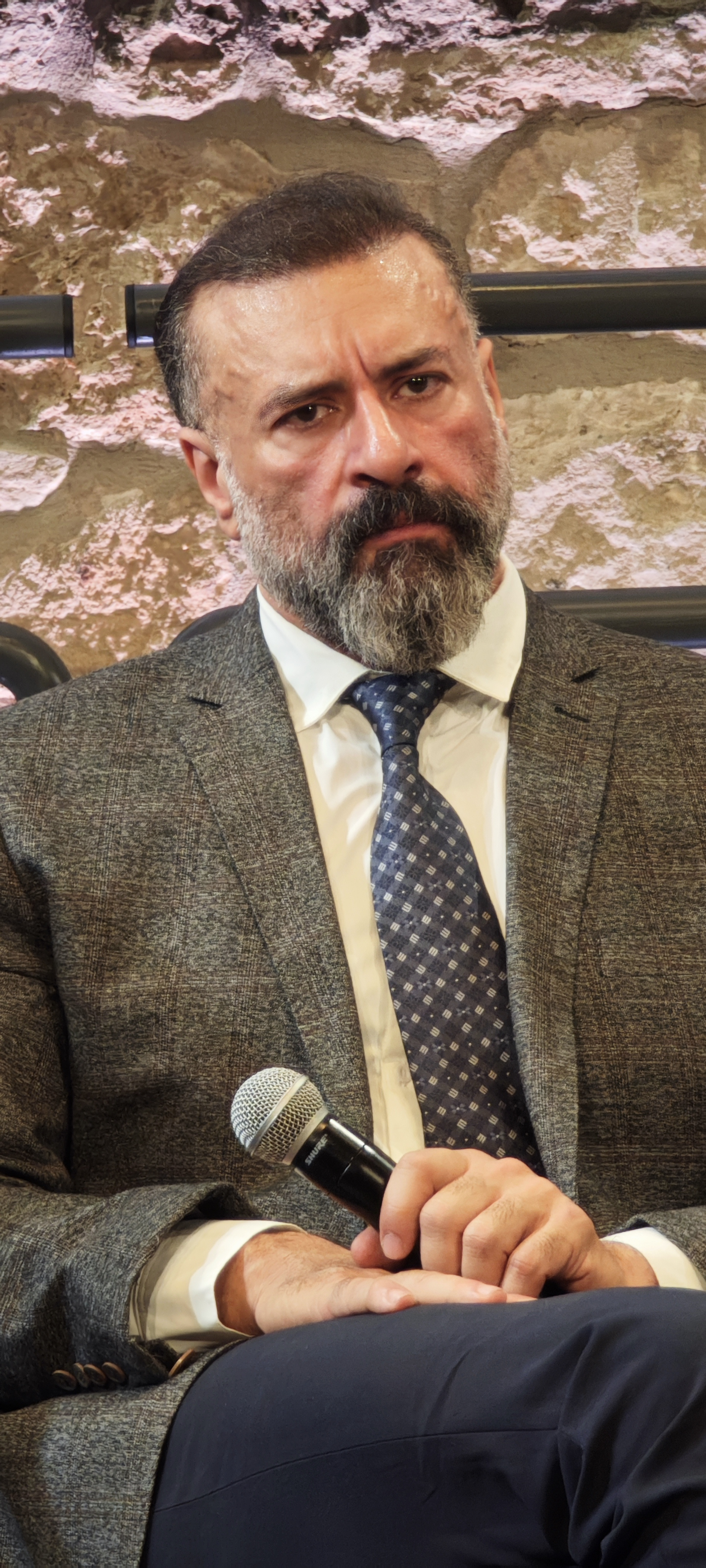
- Raymond in 2026
- Born: 1973 (age 52–53); U.S.
- Education: California State University, Fresno (BA, MA)
- Occupations: Writer, author, translator, columnist
- Website: raymondibrahim.com

Raymond Ibrahim (born 1973) is an American author, translator, columnist, former librarian, and Visiting Fellow at the Danube Institute. His focus is Arabic history and language, and current events.

== Early life and education ==
Ibrahim was born in the United States to Coptic immigrants from Egypt, and is fluent in Arabic and English. Ibrahim studied at California State University, Fresno, where he obtained a BA and an MA degree, both in History. He wrote his master's thesis under Victor Davis Hanson on the Battle of the Yarmuk. Ibrahim also took graduate courses at Georgetown University's Center for Contemporary Arab Studies and studied toward a PhD in medieval Islamic history at Catholic University.

== Career ==
Ibrahim was previously an Arabic language specialist for the Near East section at the Library of Congress, and the associate director of the Middle East Forum. As of 2023, he is the Distinguished Senior Fellow at the Gatestone Institute, which multiple watchdogs describe as an anti-Muslim outlet that promotes conspiracy theories, and the Judith Friedman Rosen Writing Fellow at the Middle East Forum, a conservative anti-Islamist think tank. He has been described as a part of the counter-jihad movement.

Ibrahim is the editor and translator of The Al Qaeda Reader, which he published after discovering a hitherto unknown Arabic al-Qaeda document; Ibrahim believes the document "proves once and for all that, despite the propaganda of al-Qaeda and its sympathizers, radical Islam's war with the West is not finite and limited to political grievances — real or imagined — but is existential, transcending time and space and deeply rooted in faith".

== Reception ==
An article Ibrahim wrote on taqiyya, which was commissioned and published by Jane's Islamic Affairs Analyst on September 26, 2008, was later characterized by another author in Jane's Islamic Affairs Analyst as being "well-researched, factual in places but ... ultimately misleading". Ibrahim responded to this charge in his rebuttal, "Taqiyya Revisited: A Response to the Critics".

In April 2020 (during the COVID-19 pandemic), the Anti-Defamation League (ADL) criticized Ibrahim for an article in FrontPage Magazine, claiming he stated Muslims were "encouraging other Muslims to come into contact with each other", that Muslims were "protesting the idea of temporarily closing mosques", and that Muslims believed "nothing associated with Islam and especially Islamic worship can get them sick". The ADL also accused Ibrahim, among other writers, of claiming that Muslims adhere to theological doctrines which encourage "irrational aversion for infidels", making Muslims more likely to willingly spread the disease to non-Muslims.

== Publications ==
- The Two Swords of Christ: Five Centuries of War between Islam and the Warrior Monks of Christendom. Bombardier Books. 2025. ISBN 979-8888457238.
- Defenders of the West: The Christian Heroes Who Stood Against Islam. Post Hill Press. 2022. ISBN 978-1642938203.
- Sword and Scimitar: Fourteen Centuries of War between Islam and the West. Da Capo Press. 2018. ISBN 978-0306825552.
- Crucified Again: Exposing Islam's New War on Christians. Regnery. 2013. ISBN 978-1621570257.
- The Al Qaeda Reader. Doubleday. 2007. ISBN 978-0-385-51655-6.
