= Rosewood Park =

- U.S. National Register of Historic Places
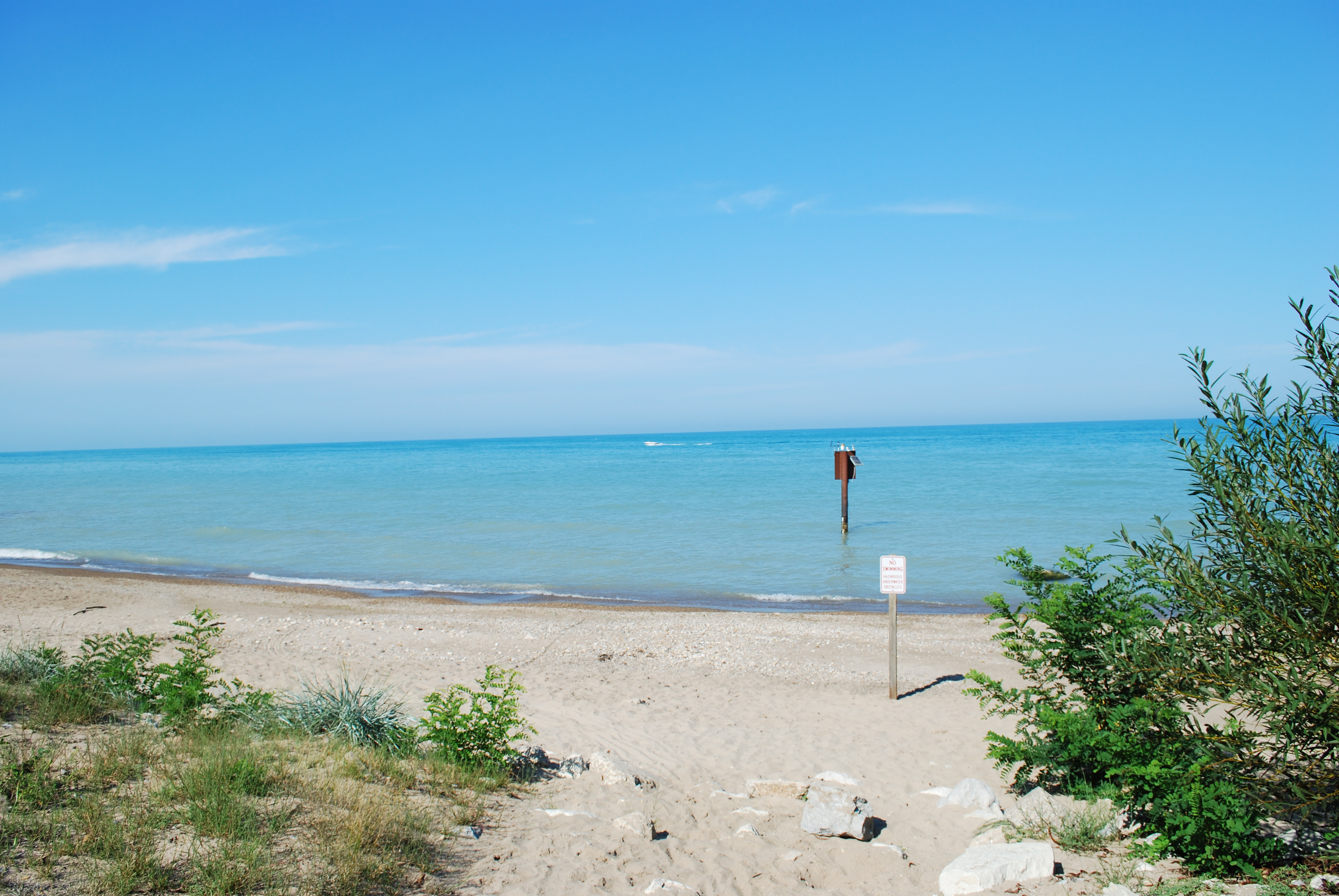

- Location within Chicago metropolitan area Location within Illinois Location within the United States
- Location: Roger Williams Ave., Highland Park, Illinois
- Coordinates: 42.16811°N 87.77007°W
- Area: 11 acres (4.5 ha)
- Architect: Jens Jensen
- MPS: Highland Park MRA
- NRHP reference No.: 82002576
- Added to NRHP: September 29, 1982

Rosewood Park is a historic park on Roger Williams Avenue in Highland Park, Illinois. The park is the former site of the Julius Rosenwald Estate, which was built circa 1910 for businessman Julius Rosenwald. Landscape architect Jens Jensen designed the estate's grounds, which he also used as a studio; these became the modern park after the home's removal. The park includes a beach on Lake Michigan, the North Shore Sanitary District Tower (closed), an empty stone pool and artificial stream, and a walking path that leads to a bridge over a ravine. Jensen also planted wildflowers in the park, which still bloom annually in spring.

The park was added to the National Register of Historic Places on September 29, 1982.
