= Various Small Fires (gallery) =

Contemporary art gallery

- Established: 2012
- Location: Los Angeles; Seoul; Dallas; Orange County (Tustin)
- Type: Contemporary art gallery
- Founder: Esther Kim Varet
- Website: www.vsf.la

Various Small Fires (often styled VSF) is a contemporary art gallery founded in 2012 by gallerist Esther Kim Varet. The gallery is based in Los Angeles, and has operated spaces in Seoul, Dallas, and Orange County (Tustin). In 2017 the gallery won the Stand Prize at Frieze for a presentation by the Harrisons.

== History ==
VSF began in 2012 as a "ad hoc space" run by Esther Kim Varet out of her home while living in Venice Beach. The name Various Small Fires is derived from a book by the artist Edward Ruscha, Various Small Fires and Milk. Kim Varet has said "I think calling it Various Small Fires shows that in my mind the gallery was always going to be in multiple locations."

The gallery established a permanent home in Hollywood. The current building was designed by Johnston MarkLee Architects and includes a dedicated sound corridor. In 2019 the gallery opened a space in the Hannam area of Seoul. A Dallas location followed in 2022, and in 2025 the gallery announced a new Orange County location in Tustin. Varet operates the gallery with her husband, Joseph Varet, who oversees business operations.

== Exhibitions and artists ==
VSF has exhibited the debuts of artists including Liz Magic Laser, Josh Kline, Jesper Just, Billy Al Bengston, and Judith Linhares.

Selected exhibitions covered by independent outlets include a 2019 solo presentation of Diedrick Brackens at Frieze New York, after which the Brooklyn Museum acquired the tapestry when no softness came (2019). Coverage also includes Josh Kline's Alternative Facts at VSF Seoul (2020), and exhibitions of Jessie Homer French in Los Angeles and Dallas. VSF also helped launch the career of Dyani White Hawk, whose paintings would go on to earn her a MacArthur genius grant.

== Reception ==
In 2017 VSF won the Focus Stand Prize for an exhibition by the Harrisons at the Frieze Art Fair. W Magazine profiled the gallery in 2023, detailing its Hollywood base and multi-site expansion. In 2024, Artsy included the gallery among the ten best booths at Frieze Los Angeles. In February 2025, after wildfires in Southern California, VSF said it would pause art fair participation, citing environmental concerns. The gallery also said that stepping away from art fairs would allow it "the opportunity to redirect focus to the community"; in the month following the wildfires, VSF announced a new Tustin space, and Kim Varet announced a run for Congress. Reporting on the Dallas art market's expansion around the Dallas Art Fair has also noted VSF's presence in the city.
