= Gatestone Institute =

American think tank focused on Islamic radicalism

Coordinates: 40°45′11″N 73°58′20″W

- Founded: 2012 (14 years ago) (Note: organization founded in 2012 per IRS Form-990)
- Founder: Nina Rosenwald
- Type: nonprofit
- Tax ID no.: 45-4724565
- Registration no.: 5119586
- Legal status: 501(c)(3)
- Purpose: human rights policy advocacy, think tank
- Headquarters: 733 3rd Ave; New York City, NY 10017-3242; United States
- President: Nina Rosenwald (Note: Rosenwald was the founding president in 2012 per IRS Form-990 yr2012)
- Key people: John R. Bolton; Rebekah Mercer; Amir Taheri; R. James Woolsey
- Parent organization: Stonegate Institute
- Revenue: $1,735,770 (Note: finances as shown on IRS Form-990 yr2021) (2021)
- Expenses: $1,843,048 (2021)
- Website: gatestoneinstitute.org

Gatestone Institute is an American far-right think tank known for publishing anti-Muslim articles. (Note: Sources describing it as anti-Muslim or anti-Islam include: "John Bolton chaired anti-Muslim think tank". NBC News.; Townsend, Mark (July 29, 2018). "#FreeTommy – the making of a far-right English 'martyr'". The Guardian.; Blumenthal, Max (June 14, 2012). "The Sugar Mama of Anti-Muslim Hate". The Nation. Archived from the original on August 28, 2019.; Huang, Frankie (November 27, 2018). "China's Most Popular App Is Full of Hate". Foreign Policy.; Sampathkumar, Mythili. "US national security adviser John Bolton was chairman of 'anti-Muslim' think tank". The Independent.; "How Anti-Muslim Propaganda Travels From Europe To North America To Trump's Twitter Account". BuzzFeed.; Beauchamp, Zack (April 23, 2018). "How John Bolton and Mike Pompeo mainstreamed Islamophobia". Vox.; "US National Security Advisor John Bolton Runs a Think Tank Claiming Europe is Becoming a Caliphate". Al Bawaba. Syndigate.info. March 27, 2018. "In combining fake reports about sharia courts and claims that the Muslim Brotherhood wants a single, global caliphate, the articles stokes Western nativist fears that Europe is being engulfed in a political Islam that will purge society and replace it with a dystopian one under the banner of Islam."; Goodstein, Laurie (April 6, 2018). "Pompeo and Bolton Appointments Raise Alarm Over Ties to Anti-Islam Groups". The New York Times. "Mr. Bolton is chairman of the Gatestone Institute, a think tank that regularly features articles on its website promoting the notion that pliant European countries, especially Britain, are submitting to "Islamization" by hostile Muslim migrants."; Levitz, Eric (March 27, 2018). "John Bolton and the Anti-Muslim Bigotry of Mainstream Conservatism". Daily Intelligencer. New York Magazine.) It was founded in 2012 by Nina Rosenwald, who serves as its president. John Bolton, former U.S. Ambassador to the United Nations and former National Security Advisor, was its chairman from 2013 until March 2018. Its current chairman is Amir Taheri. The organization has attracted attention for publishing false or inaccurate articles, some of which were shared widely.

== History ==
Gatestone Institute was founded by political activist Nina Rosenwald in 2012. The institute was founded by a parent organization that was itself founded in 2008 and which operated under two different names: Hudson Institute New York (not to be confused with the Hudson Institute) and Stonegate Institute.

The Gatestone Institute's personnel include Nina Rosenwald (President), and Naomi H. Perlman (Vice President). Amir Taheri is the Chairman of Gatestone Europe. John R. Bolton, the former U.S. Ambassador to the United Nations, served as Gatestone's chairman from 2013 to 2018, when he resigned to become National Security Advisor for President Donald Trump. Bolton was paid at least $310,000 by the organization. Its authors include Nonie Darwish, Alan Dershowitz, Raymond Ibrahim, Denis MacEoin, Daniel Pipes, Raheel Raza, Khaled Abu Toameh, Geert Wilders, Janusz Wójcik and Bat Ye'or. The Gatestone Institute has also published many articles by Lawrence Franklin, whose biography on their website makes no reference to his conviction for spying for Israel.

Rebekah Mercer, a billionaire heiress known for her donations to right-wing causes, was listed as a member of the Board of Governors of Gatestone in April 2017. After the foreign policy-focused website LobeLog inquired about her role in the organization, Gatestone removed all information about her from their website. The IRS Form-990 filing for tax year 2017 did not list Rebekah Mercer as either a member of the board of trustees, an officer of the organization, or an employee. It was later revealed that Mercer Family Foundation (of which Rebekah Mercer is a key officer) gave $150,000 to Gatestone in 2014 and 2015. Gatestone had a revenue of $2.3 million in 2016.

As of 2018, Gatestone authors, including Geert Wilders, have appeared on Russian media, including Sputnik News and RT.

== Content ==
=== Anti-Muslim bias ===
The Gatestone Institute has been frequently described as anti-Muslim, regularly publishes false reports to stoke anti-Muslim fears, and has published false stories pertaining to Muslims and Islam. Gatestone frequently warns of a looming "jihadist takeover" and "Islamization" of Europe, leading to a "Great White Death". Gatestone authors have a particular interest in Germany and Sweden, and frequently criticize leaders such as Macron and Merkel. The organization has been regarded as being part of the counter-jihad movement.

Gatestone has published the writings of Geert Wilders. It hosted a 2012 talk by Wilders and paid for a trip he made to the United States in 2016. Gatestone has been criticized for affiliating itself with Wilders, who says that he "hates Islam." Alina Polyakova, a Brookings Institution fellow and expert on far-right populism, said that Gatestone's content "was clearly anti-immigrant" and "anti-Muslim". Policy analyst J. Dana Stuster of the National Security Network, writing in The Hill, criticized Gatestone as "paranoid" for stating that immigration to Europe was "civilization jihad" and a "Muslim invasion".

The Council on American-Islamic Relations has accused Gatestone's founder, Nina Rosenwald, of anti-Muslim bias. Muslim writers for the Gatestone Institute have defended the organization and Rosenwald against the claims by CAIR. Zuhdi Jasser, founder and president of the American Islamic Forum for Democracy, said, "It goes without saying, but to those who may not know Nina, and having known her now for many years, it is clear to me that she has the highest respect for Muslims who love their faith, love God, and take seriously our Islamic responsibility to defeat the global jihad and its Islamist inspiration." Alan Dershowitz, a civil libertarian lawyer and retired academic who contributes to Gatestone, also defended the organization against charges of anti-Muslim bias.

=== Inaccurate reports ===
Multiple viral anti-immigrant and anti-Muslim falsehoods originate from Gatestone. In 2011 and 2012, Gatestone published articles claiming that Europe had Muslim "no-go zones", falsely describing them variously as "off-limits to non-Muslims" and "microstates governed by Islamic Sharia law". The claim that there are areas in European cities that are lawless and off limits to local police or governed by Sharia is false. Gatestone's claims were picked up by many outlets, including FrontPageMag, and The Washington Times. The idea of no-go zones originated from Daniel Pipes, who later retracted his claims.

On November 18, 2016, Gatestone published an article that said the British Press had been ordered to avoid reporting the Muslim identity of terrorists by the European Union. Snopes rated the claim "false". Snopes pointed out that the report only made a recommendation and it was issued by the Council of Europe, not the European Union. Gatestone subsequently corrected the article and apologized for the error, before removing it entirely from its website.

In 2017, Gatestone falsely claimed that 500 churches closed and 423 new mosques opened in London since 2001, and argued that London was being islamized and turning into "Londonistan". According to Snopes, Gatestone used "shoddy research and cherry-picked data." Specifically, Gatestone only counted churches that closed but not churches that opened; data for the period 2005–2012 alone show that 700 new churches opened in London.

Also in 2017, Gatestone ran a story about high Muslim fertility rates, headlined "Muslims Tell Europe: 'One Day This Will All Be Ours.'" However, no Muslim said the quote in question. The quote came from a French Catholic bishop who claimed that this was something that Muslims had told him. The misleadingly headlined article was widely distributed on Facebook, and its claims were repeated by other conservative websites.

The Gatestone Institute published false articles during the 2017 German federal election. A Gatestone article, shared thousands of times on social media, including by senior German far-right politicians, claimed that vacant homes were being seized in Germany to provide housing solutions for "hundreds of thousands of migrants from Africa, Asia, and the Middle East." The German fact-checker Correctiv.org found that this was false; a single house was placed in temporary trusteeship, and had nothing to do with refugees whatsoever. Gatestone also cross-posted a Daily Mail article, which, according to BuzzFeed News, "grossly mischaracterized crime data" concerning crime by refugees in Germany.

== Finances ==
Finances for the fiscal year ending 31 December 2021 (the latest available) consist of: revenue of $1,735,770; expenses of $1,843,048; and donations of $1,737,014.

== See also ==
- List of think tanks in the United States
- Mercer Family Foundation
