= Master of the Playing Cards =

German engraver (fl. 1430s-1450s)

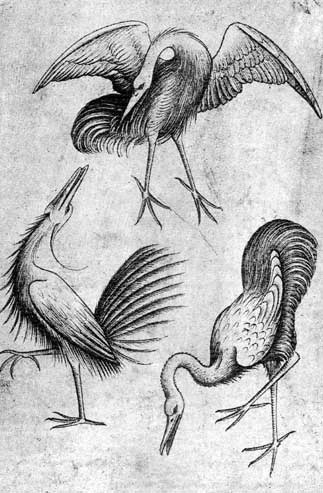
The 3 of Birds from the playing cards, a "single-plate card"

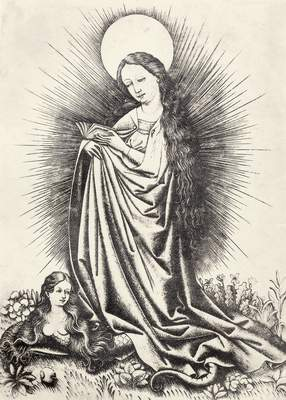
Virgin Mary

The Master of the Playing Cards (German: Meister der Spielkarten) was the first major master in the history of European printmaking. He was a German (or conceivably Swiss) engraver, and probably also a painter, active in southwestern Germany – probably in Alsace, from the 1430s to the 1450s, who has been called "the first personality in the history of engraving."

Various attempts to identify him have not been generally accepted, so he remains known only through his 106 engravings, which include the set of playing cards in five suits from which he takes his name. The majority of the set survives in unique impressions, most of which are in the Kupferstich-Kabinett in Dresden and the Bibliothèque nationale de France in Paris. A further 88 engravings are regarded as sufficiently close to his style to be the work of his pupils.

== Style ==
It has long been recognised that the Master's style was closely related to that of paintings from south-western Germany and Switzerland in the period 1430–1450, by artists of whom the best known is Konrad Witz. In addition, the Alpine cyclamen – a flowering plant native to the region – very frequently appears in the engravings. Although the theory proposed by Leo Baer to identify the Master as Witz has not been widely accepted, the Master does appear to have been trained as an artist rather than a goldsmith like many other early engravers. His prints show an engraving technique closely related to drawing, with forms conceived in three dimensions and delicately modeled; other engravers were usually trained either as armourers or as goldsmiths, such as Master E. S. or Israhel van Meckenem, and their works display a different set of stylistic conventions. The Master's shading is mostly done using parallel vertical lines, and cross-hatching is rare.

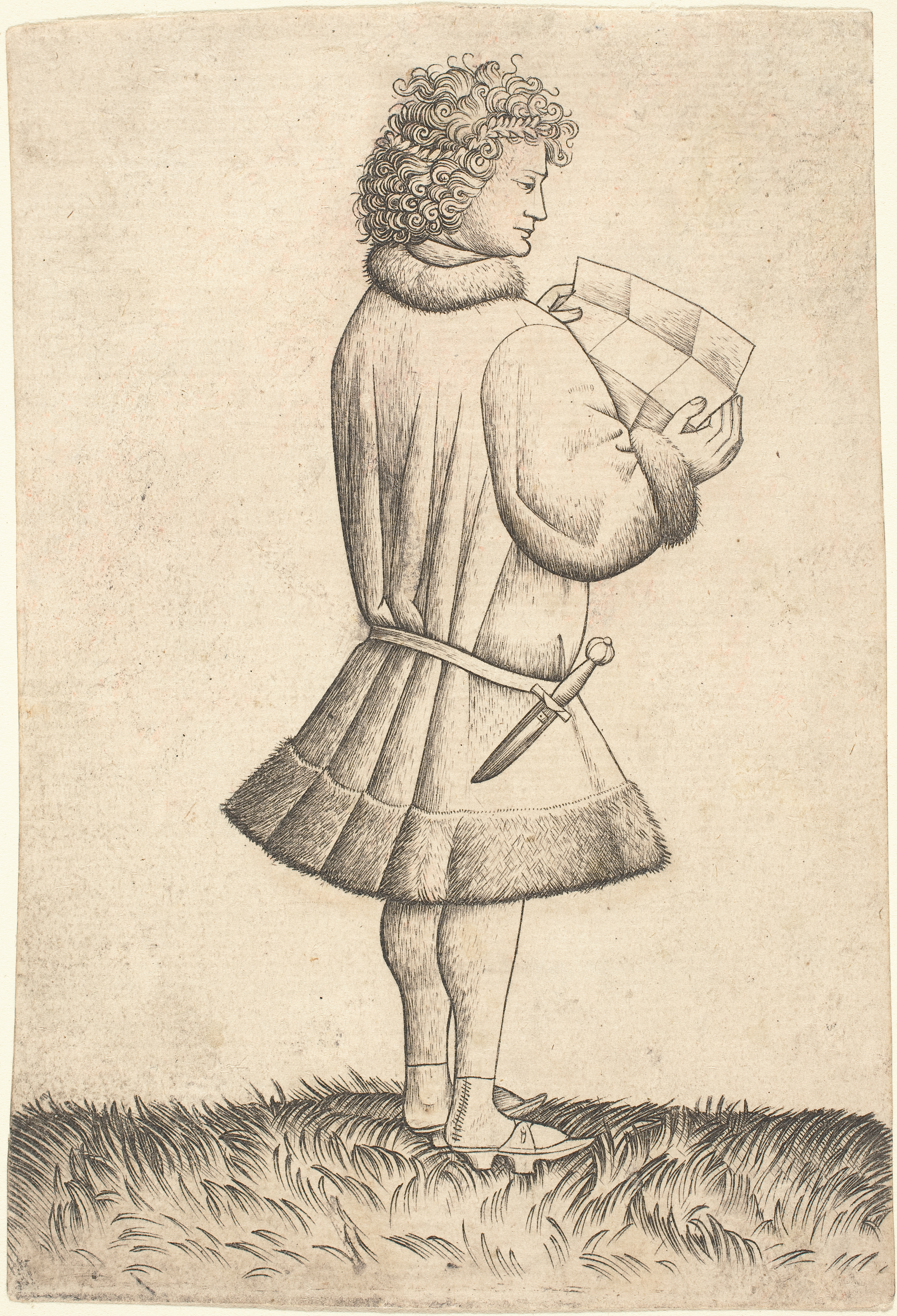
Master of the Playing Cards, A Poet Reading, 1430s, National Gallery of Art, Washington, D.C.

Apart from comparisons with paintings, the start of his period of activity can only be dated to before 1446 by a dated print by his presumed pupil, referred to as the "Master of 1446". The fact that by then he already had a mature pupil suggests that the Master himself had been active for many years by that date.

Prints done by the Master very rarely appear on the market, but on 20 September 2006 Christie's London auctioned a print titled Queen of Flowers for £243,200 (about $450,000). The print is now part of the print collection at the Metropolitan Museum of Art.

== Cards ==
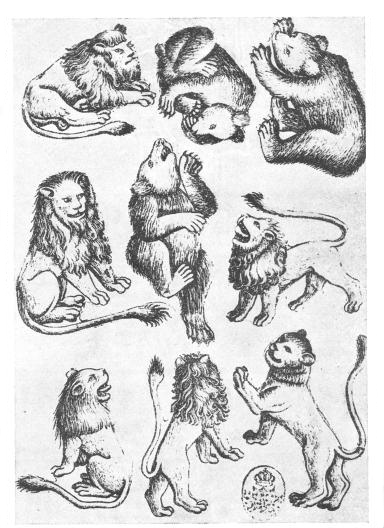
The 9 of Beasts from the playing cards. The central climbing bear also appears in an illuminated copy of the Gutenberg Bible. This is a "multiple-plate card", where each animal is on a separate small copper plate, several of which are reused on other cards.

Many of Master's engravings, especially the cards, contain compositional elements that also occur in the miniatures of the Giant Bible of Mainz of 1452–3 and other illuminations made in Mainz between then and 1482, including at least one illuminated copy of the Gutenberg Bible, which is now in the Princeton University library. It has been suggested that he painted elements of these miniatures. It is generally thought that both sets derive from a common manuscript model-book of the sort painters are known to have maintained, though this does not rule out his involvement, or that of his workshop, in the painting. There are similar repetitions in many other manuscripts and other works of art, mostly but not all German.

The cards have typical suits for Northern European cards of the period: flowers, birds, deer, beasts of prey, and wild men – so five suits in total. Each symbol (or "pip") on a card is different, so the quantity and difficulty of the engraving is far greater than found in a modern set of cards. Rapid play must also have been difficult as there are no numbers printed on the cards. Engraved sets of cards are few; they must have been much more expensive than those made in woodcut, which can be printed in much greater numbers before the matrix wears out. Most unusually, some of the cards are composed of different little plates, one per pip, which were presumably held together in a frame for printing. Possibly the Master was in Mainz and was influenced by Johannes Gutenberg's movable type. Despite this, the majority of the pips are unique, and although they appear rather jumbled as groups, when looked at individually it is apparent that many are very fine studies of their subjects. Despite the very few impressions surviving, some cards exist in two states, and some in different versions, all catalogued by Max Lehrs.

== Place in printmaking ==
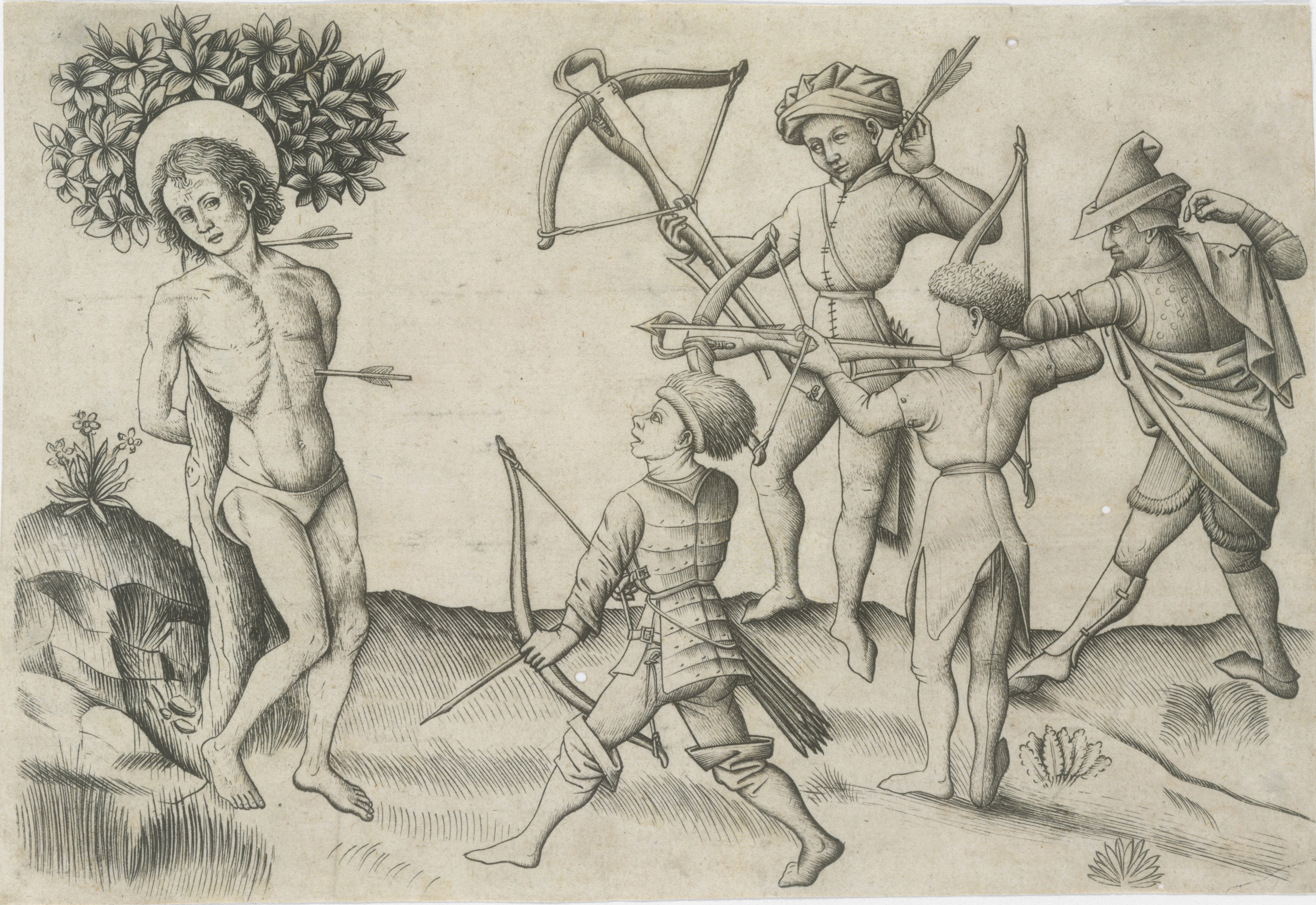
Martyrdom of Saint Sebastian (circa 1440)

Woodcut old master prints had begun around the turn of the century, and were extremely popular by the start of the Master of the Playing Cards' career, but were then almost all very crudely executed. Playing cards and religious images were the vast majority of the production. Although he comes very early in the history of engraving for prints, the Master of the Playing Cards is certainly not the inventor of the technique. He is however considered the first significant artist to use either printmaking technique. The art historian Arthur Mayger Hind characterised his style as "incisive and individual".

After him came a series of other significant engravers who had trained as either an artist or a goldsmith, and after woodcuts became widely used for illustrating printed books, their quality also improved. The Master's other works are mostly religious and some are relatively large for very early engravings; these were intended mainly for insertion as illustrations into manuscript devotional books. As with most early printmakers, many of his designs survive only in copies by others, and many have not survived at all.

Some of his presumed pupils have also been given names by art historians, such as the "Master of the Nuremberg Passion", the "Master of 1446", and the "Master of the Banderoles". If the Master also practiced as a painter, whether on panel or in manuscript illuminations, no identification of any of his works has been generally accepted.

== Literature ==
NB: Twenty-nine of the cards, and other prints, are illustrated on Commons at

- Max Geisberg: Das älteste gestochene deutsche Kartenspiel vom Meister der Spielkarten, Studien zur deutschen Kunstgeschichte, Heitz, Straßburg 1905 - The standard work on the cards, in which all are reproduced.
- Dorothy Miner, The Great Bible of Mainz, 500th Anniversary, Washington 1952
- Hellmut Lehmann-Haupt, Gutenberg and the Master of the Playing Cards, 1966 (Yale)
- Martha Anne Wood Wolff: The Master of the playing cards: an early engraver and his relationship to traditional media, 1979, Dissertation, Yale; UMI (ProQuest), Dissertation Services, 2002
- Martha Wolff: Some Manuscript Sources for the Playing Card Master's Number Cards, In: The Art Bulletin 64, Dec. 1982, p. 587-600, ISSN 0004-3079
