= Trinity Christian Academy (Addison, Texas) =

Private Christian school in Addison, Texas, United States

Location
- 17001 Addison Rd. Addison, Texas 75001; United States; 32°58′56″N 96°50′16″W

Information
- School type: Private K–12
- Motto: Educating and Developing the Whole Person for the Glory of God
- Religious affiliation: Nondenominational Christian
- Founded: 1970; 56 years ago
- Headmaster: Jeff Williams
- Teaching staff: 126.9 (FTE) (2019–20)
- Grades: PreK–12
- Enrollment: 1,334 (2019–20)
- Student to teacher ratio: 10.5 (2019–20)
- Colors: Blue and; white
- Athletics: 21 varsity level sports
- Athletics conference: TAPPS
- Mascot: Trojan
- Accreditation: Southern Association of Colleges and Schools
- Publication: The Rock Magazine; Trinity Today
- Website: trinitychristian.org

Trinity Christian Academy (TCA) is a private, non-denominational Christian school in Addison, Texas, a suburb of Dallas. TCA was established in 1970 and, as of 2020, enrolls about 1,300 students.

== History ==
The school was founded in 1970 when racial desegregation of public schools prompted the creation of many segregation academies which enrolled only white students.

In 1972, like many other predominantly white private schools, the school's enrollment surged. The headmaster, David Coterill, attributed the enrollment increase to "parents [who] are unsure and afraid of an unsettled situation". Coterill stated that the school was not intended to be an "escape hatch for segregation", but also acknowledged that interest in private schools like Trinity "was initially stirred up by the busing situation", which he previously described as producing "tragic situations". Coterill attributed the lack of Black students to their inability to do the schoolwork, stating that "We have had some Blacks apply from the area, but the pathetic situation is that they cannot make the preliminary testing." He said the school would like to offer minority student scholarships, "but we just don't have the money now." Dallas city council member George Allen countered that "by perpetuating segregation, they are perpetuating bigotry." The school's director of student development said in 2016 that "We don't look like heaven. My heart broke for that."

In 2004 the administration expelled a student for his sexual orientation. James Barnett was expelled for what school officials described as his immoral behavior and supporting an immoral cause, in reference to Barnett's orientation and involvement in the creation of a social network for gay youth.

In 2012, TCA opened an art gallery which shows student works from grades K-12, as well as hosting other artists and their work.

An annual fundraiser in 2013 for the school was headlined by Tim Tebow.

Former NFL coach Mike Singletary coached the Trinity football team in 2018-2019, departing after they went 1-21 over two seasons.

As of September 2022, Jeff D. Williams was the head of school.

== Demographics ==
In the 2019–20 school year, of the 1,379 students in grades PK-12, 1,101 (80%) were White, 85 (6%) Asian, 76 (6%) Hispanic, 59 (4%) Black, 9 (0.7%) two or more races, and 4 (0.3%) American Indian/Alaska Native.

== Athletics ==
The Trojans participate in the following sports:

- Baseball
- Basketball
- Cheerleading
- Cross Country
- Dance
- Football
- Golf
- Soccer
- Softball
- Swimming
- Tennis
- Track and Field
- Volleyball
- Wrestling

=== Championships ===
In 1997, the baseball team won the TAPPS Class 5A championship.

In 1997, Girls Singles Tennis won TAPPS 5A State Championship.

In 1998, Girls Singles Tennis and Boys Singles Tennis won TAPPS 5A State Championship.

The boys tennis doubles team won the TAPPS state championship in 2021 and 2022.

The boys golf team won its fifth straight TAPPS state championship in 2022.

The boys baseball team won the 2023 TAPPS 6A Championship, their eighth TAPPS state title since 1992.

== Notable alumni ==
- James Barnett – LGBT activist, expelled due to sexual orientation
- Jack Blocker - 2024 3rd Place American Idol finisher
- Chace Crawford – actor
- Jason Hursh – baseball player
- Esther Kim Varet – art dealer and gallerist
- Beau Morgan – former NFL player
- Blane Morgan – college football coach
- Elizabeth Neumann – former George W. Bush administration and first Trump administration official
- David Purcey – former baseball player
- Daniel Roseberry – fashion designer for Schiaparelli
- Jess Williamson – singer-songwriter
- Will Zalatoris – professional golfer
