= James Barnett (entrepreneur) =

American entrepreneur

- Born: James Mark Barnett II; September 30, 1986 (age 39); Hutchinson, Kansas, U.S.
- Occupation: Entrepreneur

James Mark Barnett II (born September 30, 1986) is an American entrepreneur and community activist from Dallas, Texas. At 17, he created a social networking site for gay teenagers and young adults called My-Boi.Com, which resulted in his father moving him from his Christian high school and his outing to his parents. His situation received national media attention and Barnett received several awards for his efforts on behalf of gay youth. Barnett has since created a web development firm and a social networking site for the general high school and college community.

== Early life ==
Barnett was motivated to create his own social networking site for gay youth after the then only existing service, XY.Com, went from being a free service to being fee based one. In July 2004, he created My-Boi.Com, announcing the free status of his service in advertisements on XY.Com.

== Expulsion, media attention and awards ==
Three months after My-Boi's creation, Trinity Christian Academy was notified of Barnett's homosexuality, and the school administration called on him to further discuss his sexual orientation. The school also notified Barnett's parents about James' homosexuality and website. A compromise was eventually reached wherein Barnett's father withdrew him from the school to avoid any damage to James' permanent school record. He completed his studies at a public high school.

Barnett's situation was picked up by both the mainstream and gay-focused press, with national organizations such as the Human Rights Council discussing his situation on The O'Reilly Factor.

In January 2005, Barnett was awarded the Point Foundation Scholarship. Vance Lancaster, the executive director of the foundation, noted that "[James' story] is a sadly common and very real example of why Point Foundation scholarships are necessary." In June 2005, Barnett was recognized with the Lawrence & Garner Courage Award, given by the Lambda Legal Foundation, for "outstanding courage in the face of uncertainty, discrimination and hostility in the advancement of civil rights for the LGBT and HIV/AIDS communities."

== Current activities ==
Barnett graduated from Plano West Senior High in 2005, a public high school. He is a graduate of the University of Texas at Dallas, where he declared business as his major.

In 2007, Barnett launched DoorQ.com, a website for gay fans of science fiction, fantasy, and horror. This is the first project of Door Q Entertainment, a Los Angeles-based production company he launched in May 2007 with two associates, Jody Wheeler and Daniel Greeney.

He also owns and operates Pointblanc, a web development corporation.
