= Samuel Arnold Greeley =

American civil engineer

Samuel Arnold Greeley (August 8, 1882, Chicago – February 3, 1968, Phoenix, Arizona) was an American civil engineer. He was largely responsible for the North Shore Sanitary District works from 1913 until 1963, and founded the engineering firm of Greeley & Hansen (originally Pearse & Greeley) Consulting Engineers in 1914.

He received the ASCE Thomas Fitch Rowland Prize in 1931, and the Rudolph Hering Medal in 1932.

In 1951, he was awarded the Frank P. Brown Medal by the Franklin Institute for his accomplishments in civil engineering.

The Samuel Arnold Greeley award for work on water supply, drainage, and related areas was established in 1968 by the American Society of Civil Engineers of which he was a past Director.

He first studied at Harvard University, receiving his B.A. in 1903, and from there he entered the Massachusetts Institute of Technology, receiving a B.S. in Sanitary Engineering in 1906. His thesis was on Boston Harbor and he suffered from typhoid fever as a result, delaying his MIT graduation by a year.

His first job was with Rudolph Hering for whom he was a principal assistant. They wrote a textbook published in 1921 on "Collection and Disposal of Municipal Refuse" which was used for many years.

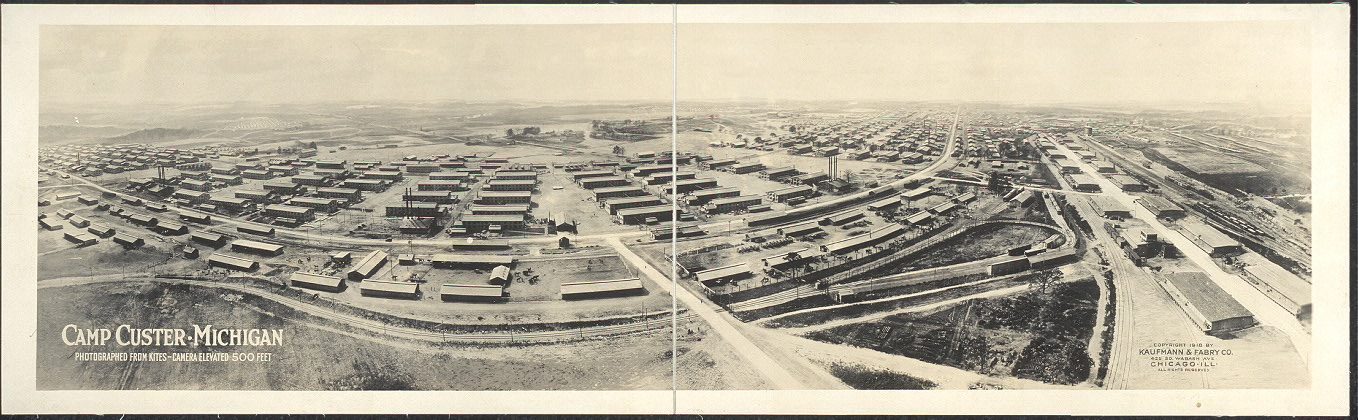
Camp Custer in 1918 photographed from 500 feet

In 1912, he worked with Langdon Pearse for the Sanitary District of Chicago, and, in 1914, they founded "Pearse & Greeley" which later became "Pearse, Greeley & Hansen" in 1920, then "Greeley & Hansen" in 1932.

In World War I, he had to design Camp Custer for 35,000 men, which later had to be enlarged, at Battle Creek, Michigan. His success led him to be appointed sanitary engineer for the United States Shipping Board for the Great Lakes, Pacific and northeast coasts of the US.

During the Great Depression, he served on the Public Works Administration Engineering Board of Review.

He later served as president of the Illinois Section of ASCE, and as national director of the ASCE.
