= Green Fire =

1954 American film by Andrew Marton

- Directed by: Andrew Marton
- Written by: Ivan Goff; Ben Roberts
- Based on: Green Fire; 1942 memoir by Peter W. Rainier
- Produced by: Armand Deutsch
- Starring: Stewart Granger; Grace Kelly; Paul Douglas; John Ericson
- Cinematography: Paul C. Vogel
- Edited by: Harold F. Kress
- Music by: Miklós Rózsa
- Production company: Metro-Goldwyn-Mayer
- Distributed by: Metro-Goldwyn-Mayer
- Release date: December 29, 1954 (U.S.)
- Running time: 100 minutes
- Country: United States
- Language: English
- Budget: $1,768,000
- Box office: $4,460,000

Green Fire is a 1954 American CinemaScope and Eastmancolor adventure drama film released by Metro-Goldwyn-Mayer. It was directed by Andrew Marton and produced by Armand Deutsch, with original music by Miklós Rózsa. The picture stars Grace Kelly, Stewart Granger, Paul Douglas and John Ericson.

Grace Kelly was under contract to MGM, which released Green Fire, though she was often dissatisfied with the roles that MGM gave her. She made many of her more famous and critically acclaimed films while loaned out to other studios such as Warner Bros. and Paramount.

== Plot ==
Rugged mining engineer Rian Mitchell discovers a lost emerald mine in the highlands of Colombia, which had last been operated by the Spanish conquistadors. Rian is a man consumed by the quest for wealth. However, he has to contend with local bandits and a savage jaguar.

Taken to recuperate at the plantation home of local coffee grower Catherine Knowland and her brother Donald, Rian manages to charm Catherine.

His partner, Vic Leonard, is preparing to leave Colombia on the next ship. Anxious to get Vic's assistance to mine the emeralds, Rian tricks Vic into staying. Returning to the mine, Rian first gets Catherine's cooperation and then resumes his romantic overtures. However, his greed to get the emeralds at any cost soon creates trouble. He comes into conflict with the chief of the local bandits, who threatens Catherine at her home. Rian also takes Donald into the mining operation, despite Donald's complete inexperience, solely in order to obtain the coffee plantation workers on for his mining needs. This, however, means that Catherine does not have enough workers available to pick the coffee when harvest time arrives. Rian's mining operations also put the plantation at risk of flooding.

When a tragic accident at the mine site kills Donald, even Vic abandons his old friend Rian and sets out to help Catherine with her harvest, all the while harboring his own passion for the beautiful young woman.

In a shootout between the bandits and Rian's men, in which Catherine and Vic do support him, Rian finally comes to his senses and realize his mistakes. At great risk to himself, he sets in place an explosion of dynamite that not only diverts the water away from Catherine's plantation, but also buries the mine under tons of rubble, from where it can no longer be reached. He reunites with a forgiving Catherine.

== Cast ==
- Stewart Granger as Rian X. Mitchell
- Grace Kelly as Catherine Knowland
- Paul Douglas as Vic Leonard
- John Ericson as Donald Knowland
- Murvyn Vye as El Moro
- José Torvay as Manuel (as Jose Torvay)
- Robert Tafur as Father Ripero
- Joe Dominguez as Jose
- Nacho Galindo as Officer Perez
- Charlita as Dolores
- Natividad Vacío as Hernandez
- Rico Alaniz as Antonio
- Paul Marion as Roberto
- Bobby Dominguez as Juan

== Production ==
=== Source material ===
The author of the memoir Green Fire, on which the film was based, was Major Peter William Rainier 1890–1945, a South African whose great-great-granduncle was the person that Mount Rainier, Washington was named after (by the explorer George Vancouver).

Rainier was a mining engineer who spent eleven years working in the Andes. The book came out in 1942. The New York Times praised its "adventure and sense of high spirit".

Rainier died in a fire at Red Lake in Canada in 1945 while inspecting mining properties.

=== Development ===
Film rights were bought by MGM. In January 1953 MGM reported that producer Armand Deutsch and writer Everett Freeman were travelling to Colombia to research Green Fire. The film was going to be made as a vehicle for Clark Gable, in the vein of Mogambo which had been a big success for the actor.

In July MGM said Gable's co star would be Grace Kelly, on the basis of her successful appearance in Mogambo. By October however the female lead was Eleanor Parker, with Ivan Goff and Ben Roberts having replaced Freeman as writer.

In September 1953 Dore Schary head of MGM announced Richard Thorpe would direct. In January 1954 the film was officially put on the studio's schedule for the year. Also in January the male role was assigned from Gable to Stewart Granger, as Gable's contract with MGM was about to expire and he refused to re-sign. Later that month Andrew Marton, who had worked with Granger on King Solomon's Mines and The Wild North, was announced as director.

Parker dropped out of the film. MGM wanted to use Grace Kelly but she refused, wanting to make The Country Girl at Paramount instead. The studio refused to loan her out. Kelly threatened to retire. Eventually MGM agreed to push back production and let her make The Country Girl (Kelly's performance in that film earned her a Best Actress Oscar).

Kelly later said Green Fire "was not the kind of picture I became an actress to do. I had to accept it for the chance to do The Country Girl and it taught me a lesson - never agree to a role before reading a script."

=== Shooting ===
In April 1954, a crew of 28, including Granger, Kelly and Paul Douglas, traveled to Colombia for three weeks of location filming. Locations included Magdalena River, Cartagena, Barranquilla, the mountains surrounding Bogota and Buenavista. The shoot was a difficult one, plagued by weather, lack of facilities and complications from the fact that there had recently been a military coup in the country and new permissions needed to be obtained.

Several exteriors were filmed in the Hollywood Hills, just off of Mulholland Drive, where the production company received permission to cut steps into part of the hill. Interiors were completed by May.

In common with all MGM CinemaScope films at the time (1954), it was filmed in both a CinemaScope and a non-anamorphic 4 x 3 version for screening in cinemas that hadn't yet converted to CinemaScope.

== Reception ==
Granger said "I had the misfortune to be in the only really bad movie Grace ever made."

=== Box office ===
According to Dore Schary the film "was a dog and we never should have made it - it was just terrible but we thought it would do well and it would bring in some money. It didn't." However, according to MGM records the film earned $1,829,000 in the US and Canada and $2,631,000 elsewhere, resulting in a profit to the studio of $834,000. In France, the film recorded admissions of 2,048,836.

== Sources ==
- Spoto, Donald (2009). High Society. Harmony Books.
