= North Shore Sanitary District Tower =

- U.S. National Register of Historic Places
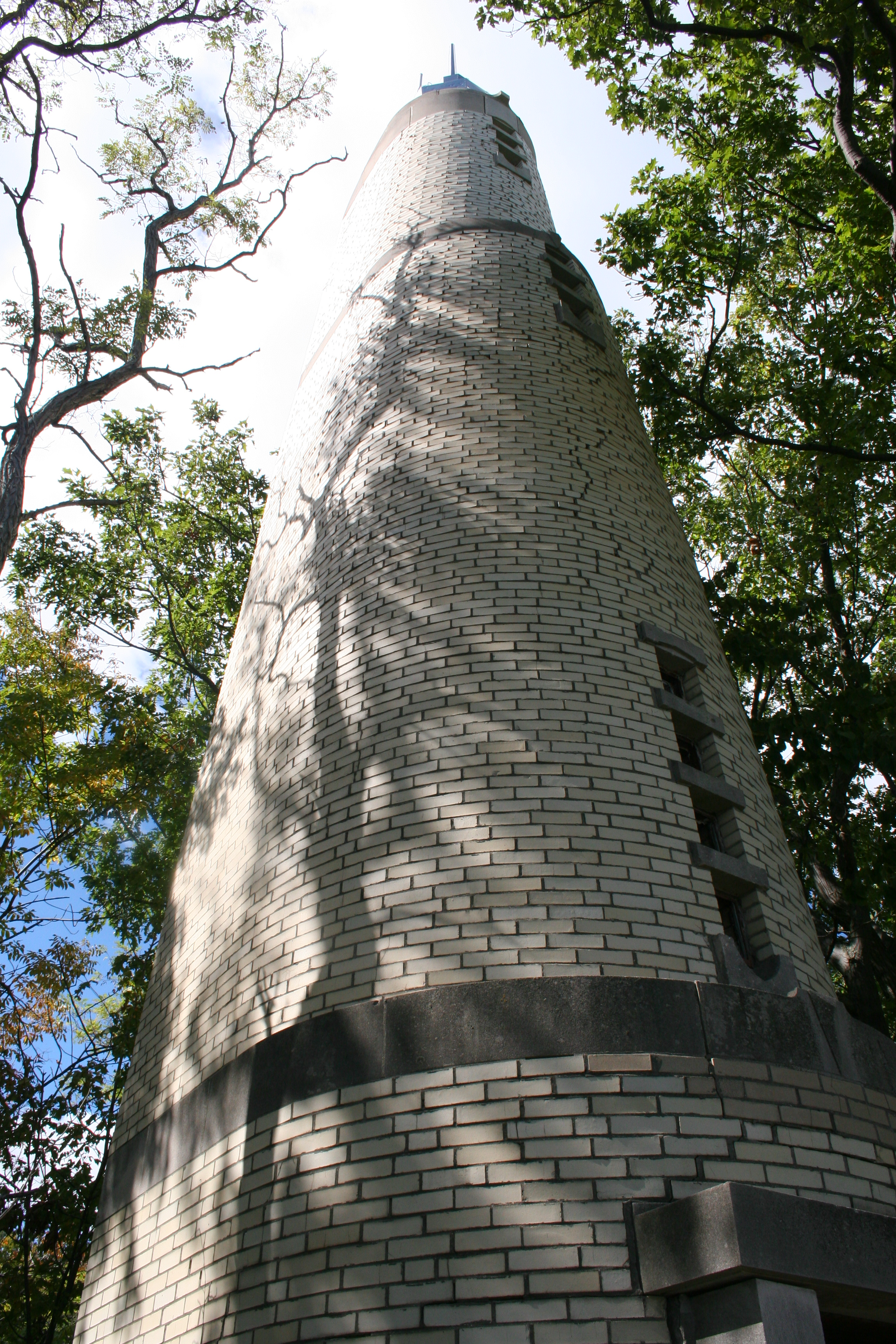

- Location within Chicago metropolitan area Location within Illinois Location within the United States
- Location: Cary Ave. Highland Park, Illinois
- Coordinates: 42.1683574°N 87.7707692°W
- Area: 0.3 acres (0.12 ha)
- Built: 1931
- Architect: Greely & Hansen, Engineers
- Architectural style: Modern Movement, Art Deco
- MPS: Highland Park MRA
- NRHP reference No.: 83000322
- Added to NRHP: June 30, 1983

The North Shore Sanitary District Tower is located in Rosewood Park, Highland Park, Illinois. It was built in 1931 to provide ventilation for the local sewer system. The brick tower is 50 feet (15 m) tall and topped by a spire. The tower features Art Deco elements, including the spire and its stone door trim and windowsills; the application of a formal architectural style is unusual in a purely functional building. It was added to the National Register of Historic Places on June 30, 1983.

The tower is featured on the cover of the album Oceania by The Smashing Pumpkins.
