= Learning Care Group =

American child care company

Learning Care Group, Inc.
- Company type: Private
- Industry: Child care
- Founded: 1967; 59 years ago
- Headquarters: Novi, Michigan, United States
- Area served: North America
- Products: Child care and early childhood education
- Owner: American Securities
- Website: learningcaregroup.com

Learning Care Group is an American child care and early childhood education company based in Novi, Michigan, United States.

The company was founded in the 1960s, and as of 2019 was the second-largest for-profit child care provider in North America, operating over 1,070+ schools. The company operates under a variety of brand names including the La Petite Academy, Childtime, Tutor Time, The Children's Courtyard, Montessori Unlimited, Everbrook Academy, AppleTree & Gilden Woods, Creative Kids Learning Center, U-GRO, Young School, and Pathways Learning Academy brands.

Learning Care Group is owned by American Securities.

== History ==
Learning Care Group was founded in the 1960s. In 2005, it was purchased by Australia-based ABC Learning. By the time it was acquired by Morgan Stanley Private Equity in March 2008, it operated 800 schools under five brands. In 2014, it was acquired by private equity firm American Securities.
