= American Securities =

American private equity firm

American Securities LLC
- Type: Private
- Industry: Private equity
- Founded: 1947; 79 years ago
- Founder: Michael Fisch
- Headquarters: 590 Madison Avenue; New York City, New York, U.S.
- Products: Private equity funds, Leveraged buyouts
- AUM: $23 billion (2026)
- Website: www.american-securities.com

American Securities LLC is an American private equity firm based in New York with an office in Shanghai that invests in U.S. companies, primarily in the industrial and B2B services sectors. With $23 billion under management, the firm partners with businesses generating $200 million to $2 billion in annual revenue. American Securities started as a family office, established in 1947 by William Rosenwald, the son of Julius Rosenwald, the longtime CEO of Sears, Roebuck and Co., to manage the Rosenwald family’s wealth.

== History ==
CEO Michael Fisch at a 2026 speaking engagement

William Rosenwald—who had inherited the Rosenwald fortune from his father Julius Rosenwald—founded American Securities Capital Partners in 1947. Investments included Ametek and Western Union.

In 1993, Michael G. Fisch became the William Rosenwald family's financial advisor.

In 1994, American Securities launched its inaugural private equity fund under the leadership of Michael Fisch and Charles Klein, with a focus on partnering with market-leading businesses. Fisch had previously worked at Goldman Sachs and Bain & Company before he joined American Securities. Under Fisch and the firm’s leadership, American Securities scaled from a family office to an institutionally backed fund management firm. By 2023, the firm had grown to secure $26 billion of managed funds from an initial investment fund of $71 million in 1993.

In June 2009, American Securities Capital Partners officially changed its name to American Securities LLC.

== Current investments ==
Investments as of 2021:

- Amentum
- Aramsco
- Aspen Dental
- BELFOR
- Conair
- FleetPride
- Hexion
- Integrated Global Services (IGS)
- Learning Care Group
- Meridian
- North American Partners in Anesthesia
- NWN
- OnTrac
- RealManage
- r-pac
- SimonMed
- SOLV Energy
- Trace3
- United PF
- ViaPath
- Vibrantz

== Previous investments ==
Previous investments as of 2021.

- Acuren
- Advanced Drainage Systems
- Air Methods
- Anthony International
- Arizona Chemical
- Blue Bird
- Cambridge International
- Caribbean Restaurants
- Chromaflo Technologies
- Community Pacific Broadcasting
- CPM
- CTB International
- Delphi Midstream Partners
- Dr. Leonard's Healthcare
- El Pollo Loco
- Emerald Performance Materials
- Fairmount Santrol
- FiberMark
- Foundation Building Materials
- Frontier Spinning Mills
- General Chemical
- Grede
- GT Technologies
- Healthy Directions
- Henry Company
- HHI
- Ketema, Inc.
- Lakeside Energy
- Liberty Tire Recycling
- MECS
- Metaldyne
- Metaldyne Performance Group
- Milk Specialties Global
- Miltex Instrument Company
- Mortgage Contracting Services
- MVE
- MW Industries
- NEP Broadcasting
- Oreck Corporation
- Oregon Tool
- PDM Bridge
- Potbelly Sandwich Works
- Presidio
- Press Ganey
- Primary Energy Ventures
- Prince Robertson Fuel Systems
- Royal Adhesives and Sealants
- SeaStar Solutions
- SpecialtyCare
- Tekni-Plex
- TNP Enterprises
- Ulterra Drilling Technologies
- Unifrax Corporation
- Unison Site Management
- United Distribution Group
- VUTEk
- Weasler Engineering
- Westward
