= Diedrick Brackens =

American artist

- Born: 1989 (age 36–37); Mexia, Texas
- Education: University of North Texas, California College of Arts
- Known for: Woven Tapestries
- Awards: Barclay Simpson Award from California College of Arts, Clare Hart DeGloyer Memorial Fund
- Website: https://www.diedrickbrackens.com/

Diedrick Brackens (born 1989 in Mexia, Texas; lives and works in Los Angeles) is an American artist and weaver. Brackens is well known for his woven tapestries that explore African American and queer identity.

== Biography ==
Brackens spent his early years moving between Army bases whilst his father served in the military. He received his BFA from the University of North Texas in 2011. It was here that he was first introduced to the discipline of weaving. He then pursued an MFA degree at the California College of the Arts in 2014. Under the teachings of textile artist Josh Faught, his work on the exploration of queer identity inspired Brackens to explore his own themes of African and American history, as well as his own identity as a gay black man living in the southern United States. He was a professor and head of the fiber program at California State University, Long Beach from 2015 to 2019.

== Career ==
His work has been shown in multiple solo exhibitions at the Craft Contemporary, Los Angeles, (2022); Jack Shainman Gallery, New York, (2021); Blanton Museum of Art (2020); Ulrich Museum of Art, Wichita (2017); Steve Turner Gallery, Los Angeles, Joan Mitchell Center Residency, (2016); and Johansson Projects, Oakland (2015). Group exhibitions include SOMArts, San Francisco (2014); Berkeley Art Museum (2014); 3rd Ghetto Biennale, Port-au-Prince, Haiti (2013); and Museum of Geometric Art, Dallas (2011).

== Style ==
Brackens incorporates weaving and quilting techniques from across the globe as a base for his tapestries, initially beginning as a primarily sketch created from photographs from the internet or self-portraits.

== Notable works ==
Bitter attendance, drown jubilee, 2018, is one of Brackens more acclaimed tapestries. Made from woven cotton, acrylic yarn and silk organza, the artwork depicts three teenagers as large catfish surrounding two silhouetted figures fishing. The figure on the right of the tapestry is seen cradling the larger of the catfish as a pair of golden handcuffs stand out in the foreground. The artwork is based on a real-life event that happened in Brackens home town of Mexia, eight years before he was born. During a Juneteenth celebration, three young black teenagers were arrested and loaded onto a boat by the local law enforcement for possession of marijuana. When the boat capsized, the three men drowned as they unable to free themselves from the handcuffs in time. The police officers were brought to trial, although no charges were pressed. To this day, the effects of the terrible event that transpired has had a lasting impact on the community, further adding to the already heightened racial tensions. The legacy of racial injustice is a theme that appears throughout Brackens' works.

== Awards ==
- Joyce Alexander Wein Artist Prize from The Studio Museum in Harlem (2018)
- Barclay Simpson Award from the California College of the Arts (2014)
- Clare Hart DeGolyer Memorial Fund (2011)
