= Lessing J. Rosenwald =

American businessman (1891–1979)

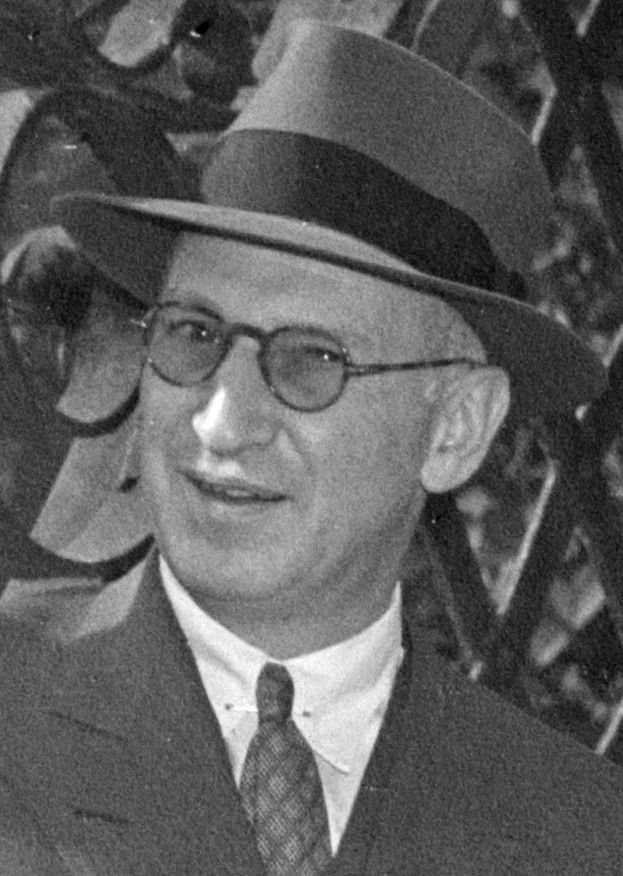
- Born: February 10, 1891
- Died: June 24, 1979 (age 88)
- Education: Cornell University, (dropped out)
- Occupations: Businessman; Collector
- Spouse: Edith Clementine Goodkind
- Children: 5
- Parent: Julius Rosenwald

Lessing Julius Rosenwald (February 10, 1891 – June 24, 1979) was an American businessman, a collector of rare books and art, a chess patron, and a philanthropist.

== Biography ==
Rosenwald was born in Chicago, the eldest son of Julius Rosenwald, a clothier who became part-owner and was president of Sears, Roebuck and Company from 1908 to 1923, and chairman from 1923 to 1932. Lessing left Cornell University and went to work for Sears in 1911 as a shipping clerk, and in 1920, was given the responsibility of opening a catalog supply center for the growing mail-order company in Philadelphia. He resided for many years in Jenkintown, Pennsylvania. In 1913 he married Edith Goodkind and together they had five children: Julius "Dooley" Rosenwald II, Robert L. Rosenwald, Helen Rosenwald Snellenburg, Joan Rosenwald Scott, and Janet Rosenwald Becker.

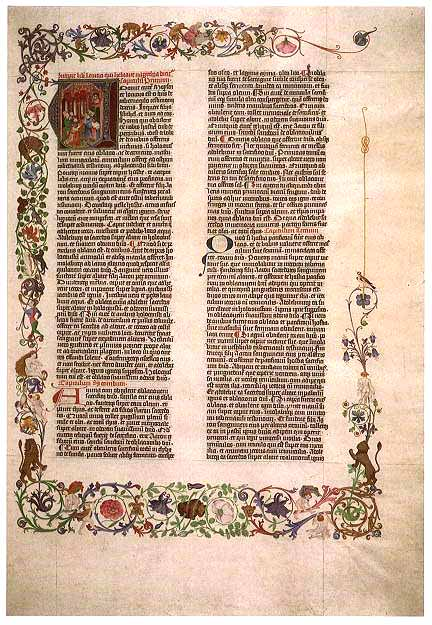
Giant Bible of Mainz donated by Rosenwald to the Library of Congress

Succeeding his father, he was chairman of Sears from 1932 until 1939, when he dedicated himself full-time to collecting rare books and art, as well as managing the family charities, chiefly the Julius Rosenwald Fund, which made fellowship grants directly to hundreds of African-American artists, writers, researchers and intellectuals. In 1943, he pledged to donate his collections of rare books and art. After his death, 2,600 rare books, which trace the illustrated book through the last six centuries, and 5,000 reference books were given to the Library of Congress, which remains one of the most distinguished collections in the Rare Books and Special Collections division. Additionally, 27,000 prints and drawings were donated to the National Gallery of Art, both located in Washington, D.C. He was one of the founding donors of the National Gallery of Art when it opened in 1941. The "Giant Bible of Mainz" has been on permanent display in the great entrance hall of the Library of Congress since Rosenwald donated it in 1952, when it was 500 years old. Rosenwald held his collection at his private gallery, the Alverthorpe Gallery, within the Abington Art Center. He was elected to the American Philosophical Society in 1947.

Rosenwald was also a chess enthusiast, and donated money to support American chess. He sponsored the U.S. Chess Championship from 1957 to 1969.

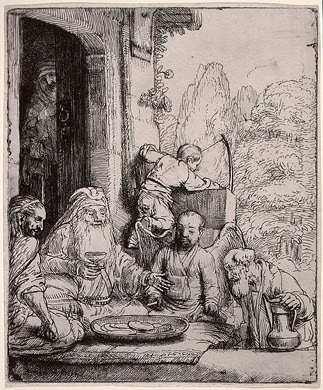
Rembrandt's Abraham Entertaining the Angels, 1656. One of 27,000 items donated by Rosenwald to the National Gallery of Art

In 1971, he was honored with the Sir Thomas More Medal for Book Collecting, "Private Collecting for the Public Good," by the University of San Francisco Gleeson Library and the Gleeson Library Associates.

== Political activities ==
Rosenwald was the best known Jewish supporter of the America First Committee, which advocated American neutrality in World War II before the attack on Pearl Harbor, and was led by his successor at Sears-Roebuck and lifelong friend Robert E. Wood. Just three months after its founding, he resigned from the committee's board in December 1940 over concerns about antisemitism. He became director of the Bureau of Industrial Conservation in the War Production Board during World War II.

In 1943, Rosenwald accepted the invitation to become President of the American Council for Judaism, an association of anti-Zionist Reform Jews, a position he held until 1955; after that he remained chairman of the board. During this time, Rosenwald was also active in rescue efforts of European Jews, and urged the United States to admit large numbers of refugees, both Jew and Gentile.

== In popular culture ==
Lessing J. Rosenwald's importance as a rare book collector and donor to the Library of Congress is featured in David Baldacci's novel, The Camel Club, London (Pan Books) 2006, p. 164 ff.
