= William Rosenwald =

American businessman and philanthropist (1903–1996)

- Born: August 19, 1903; Wilmette, Illinois
- Died: October 31, 1996 (aged 93); New York, N.Y.
- Education: MIT, (BS)
- Occupations: Businessman and philanthropist
- Spouse: Mary Kurtz Rosenwald (m. 1938; died 1985)
- Children: 3
- Parent(s): Julius Rosenwald; Augusta Nusbaum
- Relatives: Edgar B. Stern Jr.(nephew); Philip M. Stern(nephew); Audrey Stern Hess(niece)

William Rosenwald (August 19, 1903 – October 31, 1996) was an American businessman and philanthropist. His American Securities Corporation invested in other business including AMETEK and Western Union International. He helped establish the nationwide United Jewish Appeal in 1939 and made other charitable grants through the William Rosenwald Family Fund. His father was Julius Rosenwald, the former chairman of Sears, Roebuck and Company and a leading philanthropist whose Rosenwald Fund built 5,000 schools for black children in the South a few decades after the U.S. Civil War.

== Biography ==
William Rosenwald was born in Wilmette, Illinois, in 1903; the second son of Julius Rosenwald and the former Augusta Nusbaum. He attended the MIT Sloan School of Management, where he earned a Bachelor of Science degree in 1924. Rosenwald also attended Harvard University for a year as well as the London School of Economics. He was employed by Sears, Roebuck starting in 1928, and was a director of the firm from 1934 to 1938. It was also in 1928 that Rosenwald married his first wife, Renee Scharf, daughter of Austrian painter Viktor Scharf II.

He organized a family effort in the mid-1930s to provide assistance to relatives in Europe affected by the rise of Nazi Germany. By 1948 over 300 individuals had been brought to the United States and provided with work and places to live. An additional 300 family members in Europe were also provided for. In a 1935 interview, Rosenwald stated that "There is the thought in my mind -- and that I would like to get across to the Jews of America -- that to the extent that the Jews as a whole help their suffering brethren, we will fortify the Jews of all countries against anti-Semitic onslaughts." He organized the National Refugee Service (later a part of the Hebrew Immigrant Aid Society) in 1939, to help resettle refugees.

In 1938, Rosenwald married Mary Kurtz, his second wife, with whom he had three daughters. Kurtz died in 1985.

In January 1939, Rosenwald's National Coordinating Committee Fund joined with Rabbi Jonah Wise of the American Jewish Joint Distribution Committee, Rabbi Abba Hillel Silver of the United Palestine Appeal, to form the United Jewish Appeal for Refugees and Overseas Needs. The founders emphasized that the funds needed to support Jews in Europe and Palestine would be triple to quadruple the amount raised in the previous year. While the organizations would raise funds together, the Joint Distribution Committee would assist Jews in Europe, the United Palestine Appeal would aid the Jewish community in Palestine, including refugees from Europe arriving there and the National Coordinating Committee Fund would assist refugees arriving in the United States. From 1942 to 1946, Rosenwald was one of the UJA's three national chairmen, leading the first campaign to raise more than $100 million, and led campaigns again from 1955 to 1957.

In 1974, Rosenwald oversaw the merger of the joint campaign between United Jewish Appeal of Greater New York and the Federation of Jewish Philanthropies and was named as the first president of the combined campaign. This joint fundraising campaign by the two philanthropic organizations was the first step in the complete merger of the organizations in 1986.

Rosenwald served on the board of the Tuskegee Institute for 40 years and was a longtime board member of the New York Philharmonic. He served on the executive committee of the American Jewish Joint Distribution Committee for five decades and was an active leader of the American Jewish Committee and the Council of Jewish Federations, among many other organizations.

Rosenwald died at age 93 on October 31, 1996, at his apartment on the Upper East Side of Manhattan. Rosenwald was survived by his three daughters, Nina Rosenwald being one of them, and five grandchildren.

== Awards ==
In 1960, Rosenwald received the Solomon Bublick Award of the Hebrew University of Jerusalem in recognition of his "significant contribution to the progress and development of Israel”.
