= Julius Rosenwald =

American businessman (1862–1932)

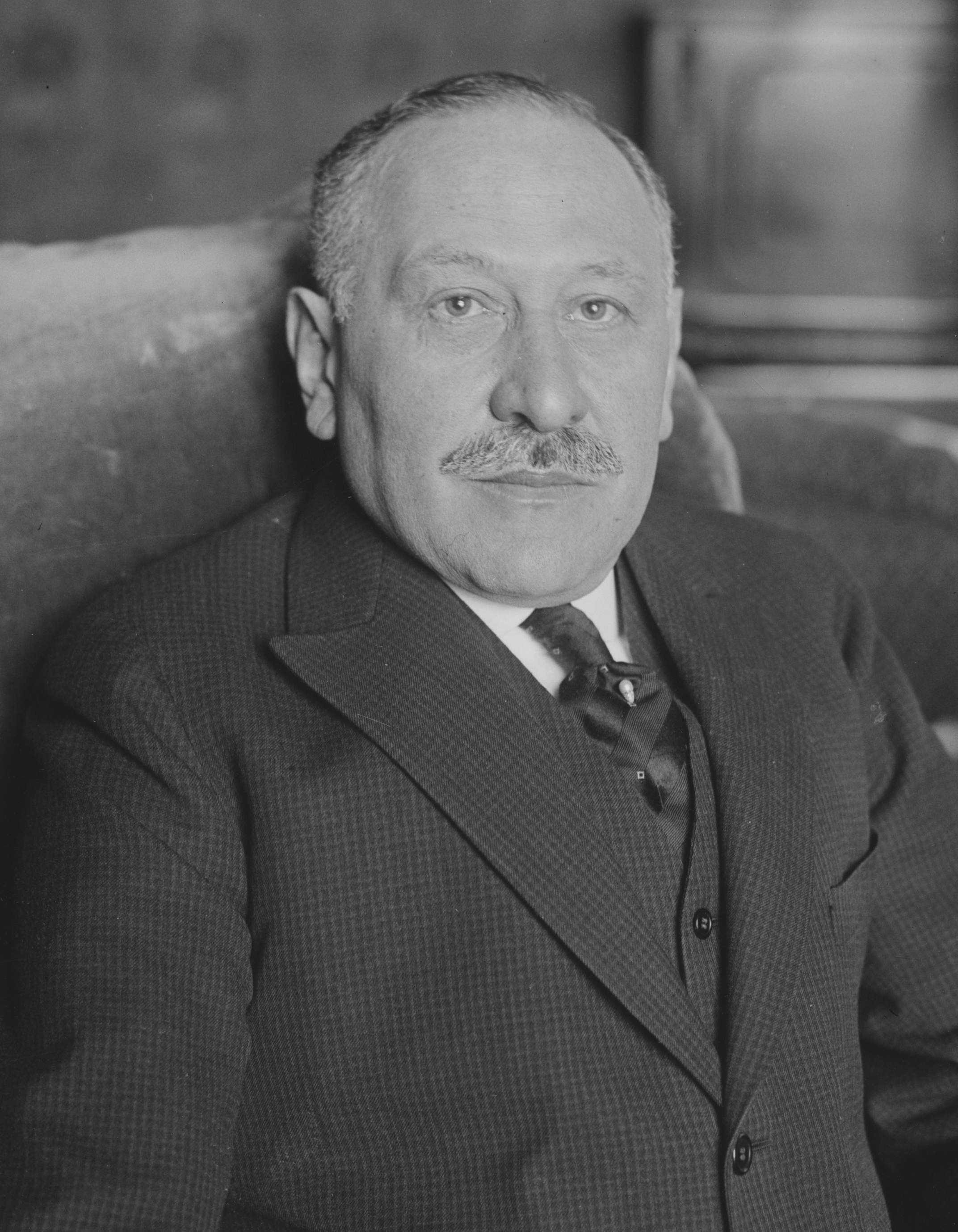
- Rosenwald in 1915
- Born: August 12, 1862; Springfield, Illinois, U.S.
- Died: January 6, 1932 (aged 69); Highland Park, Illinois, U.S.
- Resting place: Rosehill Cemetery
- Spouse: Augusta Nusbaum
- Children: 5, including Marion, Lessing, Edith Rosenwald Stern, and William Rosenwald
- Relatives: Edgar B. Stern Sr. (son-in-law); Nina Rosenwald (granddaughter); Armand Deutsch (grandson)

Signature
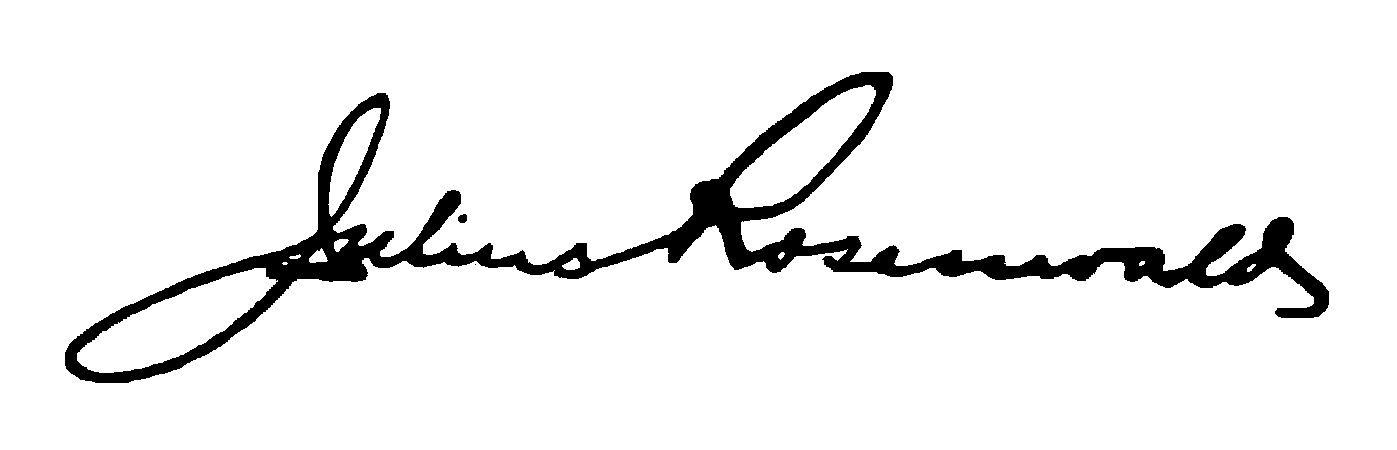

Julius Rosenwald (August 12, 1862 – January 6, 1932) was a Jewish American business executive and philanthropist. He was the long-time president and an owner of Sears, Roebuck and Company, a large and successful Chicago-based national retailer in the early 20th century. His Rosenwald Fund donated millions in matching funds to promote Black American education. Together with Booker T Washington, they built close to 5,000 schools, many of them in the segregated south and provided fellowships to close to one thousand grantees. In 1919 Rosenwald was appointed to the Chicago Commission on Race Relations. He was the principal founder and benefactor of the Museum of Science and Industry, serving as president from 1927 to 1932.

== Early life ==
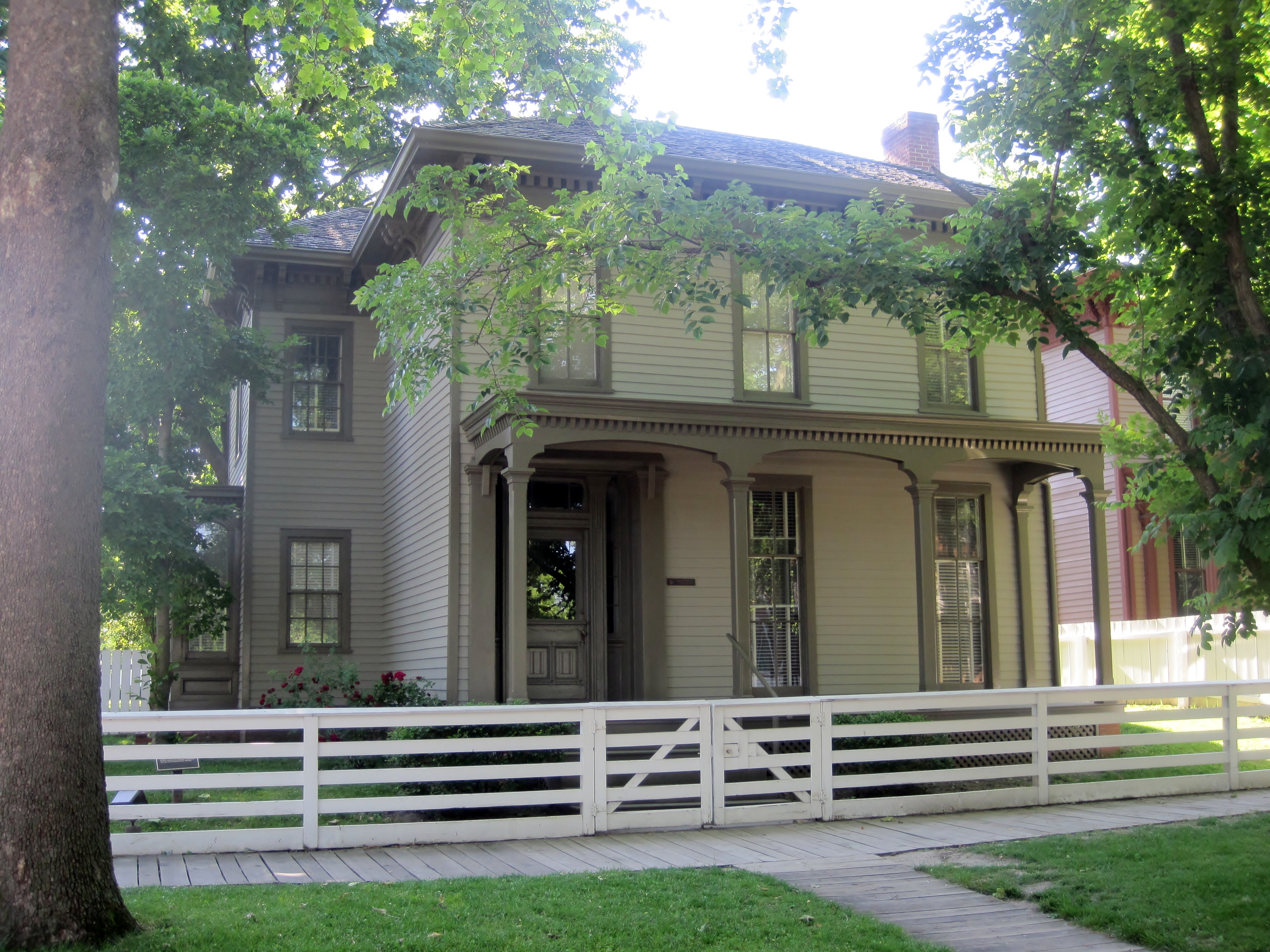
Rosenwald was born in Springfield, Illinois during the American Civil War. His childhood home and neighborhood is now part of the Lincoln Home National Historic Site.

Julius Rosenwald was born in 1862 in Springfield, Illinois, to the clothier Samuel Rosenwald and his wife Augusta (Hammerslough), a Jewish immigrant couple from Germany, who arrived in the US with 20 dollars in his pocket. Julius Rosenwald was Samuel and Augusta’s second child to survive infancy. He was born and raised just a few blocks from Abraham Lincoln's residence in Springfield, Illinois, during Lincoln's presidency. In 2020, the house, formerly known as Lyon House, was renamed in his honor, and a plaque erected.

Additionally, Samuel Rosenwald served as the president of the B’rith Sholom synagogue of the Springfield Hebrew Congregation, where Julius received a Jewish education and learned lifelong lessons about the importance of "tzedakah" or charity, and "tikkun olam" or repairing the world, which shaped his values.

By his sixteenth year, Rosenwald was apprenticed by his parents to his uncles in New York City to learn the clothing trades. While in New York, he befriended Henry Goldman and Henry Morgenthau Sr. With his younger brother Morris, Rosenwald started a clothing manufacturing company.

Rosenwald had heard about other clothiers who had begun to manufacture clothing according to standardized sizes from data collected during the American Civil War. He decided to try the system but to move his manufacturing facility closer to the rural population that he anticipated would be his market. He and his brother moved to Chicago, Illinois.

== Marriage and family ==
In 1890, Rosenwald married Augusta "Gussie" Nusbaum, a daughter of a competing clothier. Together they had five children: Lessing J. Rosenwald, Adele (Rosenwald) Deutsch Levy, Edith (Rosenwald) Stern, Marion (Rosenwald) Ascoli―second wife of Italian American journalist Max Ascoli―and William Rosenwald. Their son, Lessing Rosenwald, became a prominent businessman, following his father in the chairmanship of Sears, Roebuck & Company (1932–1939). William was also a successful businessman and philanthropist who created the United Jewish Appeal and established the William Rosenwald Family Fund. Edith married businessman Edgar B. Stern Sr.

One of his grandchildren is Nina Rosenwald. Another was the Hollywood film producer Armand Deutsch, who believed that he was the intended target of the thrill killers Leopold and Loeb, who kidnapped and murdered his schoolmate Robert "Bobby" Franks on May 21, 1924.

== Sears, Roebuck & Company ==
In 1893, Richard Sears and Alvah C. Roebuck renamed their watch company Sears, Roebuck & Company and began to diversify. Rosenwald and Weil was a principal supplier of men's clothing for Sears, Roebuck. The volumes of unsold merchandise caused by the Panic of 1893 and his declining health led Roebuck to leave the company.

Roebuck placed his interest in the company in the hands of Sears who, in turn, offered that half of the company be sold to Chicago businessman Aaron Nusbaum, who in turn brought in Rosenwald, to whom Sears owed money. In August 1895, Sears sold Roebuck's half of the company to Nusbaum and Rosenwald for $75,000. The new Sears, Roebuck and Company was re-incorporated in Illinois with a capital stock of $150,000 in August 1895. Sears and Rosenwald got along well, but Nusbaum, who was Gussie Rosenwald's brother, was a problem. Sears and Rosenwald bought him out for $1.3 million in 1903.

Rosenwald brought to the company a rational management philosophy and diversified product lines: dry goods, consumer durables, drugs, hardware, furniture, and nearly anything else a farm household could desire. The company's initiative at this time was particularly fortuitous with the initiation of Rural Free Delivery by the Post Office in 1896. From 1895 to 1907, under Rosenwald's leadership as vice president and treasurer, annual sales of the company climbed from $750,000 to upwards of $50 million. The prosperity of the company and their vision for greater expansion led Sears and Rosenwald to take the company public in 1906, with $40 million in stock. Rosenwald turned to his old friend Henry Goldman, who was now a senior partner at Goldman Sachs, to handle the initial public offering of the stock. After Sears resigned the presidency in 1908 due to declining health, Rosenwald was named president.

On January 2, 1915, Rosenwald was indicted in Chicago for a failure to file a personal property tax schedule. One commenter described the indictment as "a shot heard around the world". Prior to the indictment the Tax Board of Review scheduled the value of Rosenwald's Sears' stock at $7,500,000. Rosenwald declared this to be greatly excessive and additionally claimed that the stock of the New York company did not represent tangible assets. The indictment was quashed in March 1915 when Rosenwald's attorneys convinced the Court that the section of law which provided for prosecution of such cases had been repealed.

The company was laid low during the post-World War I recession as a severe depression hit the nation's farms after farmers had over-expanded their holdings. To bail out the company, Rosenwald pledged $21 million of his personal wealth. By 1922, Sears had regained financial stability. Two years later, in 1924, Rosenwald resigned the presidency, but remained as chairman; his goal was to devote more time to philanthropy. First he oversaw the design and construction of the company's first department store within Sears, Roebuck's massive 16-hectare (40-acre) headquarters complex of offices, laboratories, and mail-order operations at Homan Ave. and Arthington St. on Chicago's West Side. The store opened on February 2, 1925. After leaving the presidency, Rosenwald was appointed chairman of the Board of Sears, a position he held until his death in 1932.

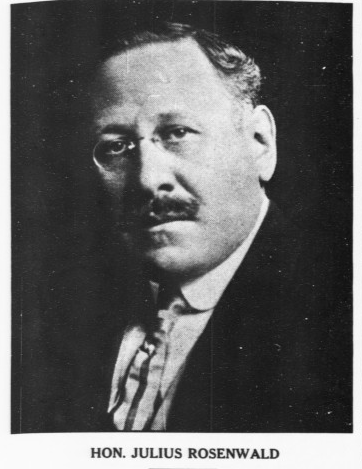
Hon. Julius Rosenwald, December 23, 1922.

== Philanthropy ==
Rosenwald believed that having money meant that you needed to use it responsibly, thus a large part of his income was donated to charity. Hasia R. Diner, Rosenwald's biographer, says that this philosophy was part of this Jewish identity and part of the biblical injunction "remember the stranger for you, too, were strangers." It also reflected his desire to make America a more inclusive place that would offer refuge for Jews and others who faced inequities or justice for all.

Simply put he explained, “What I want to do is try and cure the things that seem wrong”.

This line of thinking resulted in strong ties to the African American population of the early twentieth century. One of his most noted contributions was fostered by his partnership with Booker T. Washington. Additionally, Rosenwald was concerned about justice for all, and he believed that the plight of African Americans was deeply connected with the inequities faced by Jews throughout their history. This became even more important to him after meeting Booker T. Washington before the start of the first World War. He explained that his desire to improve education for African Americans in the U.S. when he said that “very few persons are interested in the education of the Negro that I have deemed it wiser to concentrate my efforts in that direction”. Rosenwald’s philanthropic pursuits thus combined his strong sense of responsibility to aid in social inequality with his reverence for education and learning.

After the 1906 financial reorganization of Sears, Rosenwald became friends with Goldman Sachs's other senior partner, Paul J. Sachs, who often stayed with Rosenwald during his many trips to Chicago. The two would discuss America's social situation, agreeing that the plight of African Americans was the most serious in the U.S. Sachs introduced Rosenwald to two prominent educators and proponents of African-American education, William H. Baldwin and Booker T. Washington. Rosenwald made a common cause with Washington and was asked to serve on the board of directors of the Tuskegee Institute in 1912, a position he held for the remainder of his life. He endowed the institute to free Washington from fundraising and enabled him to devote more time managing the institute.

His philosophy regarding philanthropy vs. charity was to involve the recipients in the contribution via a matching system. The matching system provided part of the budgets of the Rosenwald schools which were matched by local citizens, both blacks and white, but also supported by the local municipality via local taxes. Through this initiative public schools for African American students were created with the southern states and their own constituents took responsibility.

He later established his Rosenwald Fund in 1917 which provided fellowships and other contributions primarily, but not only for African Americans. Its stated goal was for "the well-being of mankind". Unlike other endowed foundations, which were designed to fund themselves in perpetuity, the Rosenwald Fund was intended to use all of its funds for philanthropic purposes. As a result, the fund was completely spent by 1948.

Rosenwald’s Jewishly-motivated empathy with former slaves in the South was publicly acknowledged in his own lifetime. Rosenwald reportedly found personal satisfaction in helping others, Jews and non-Jews: “All the other pleasures in life seem to wear out, but the pleasure of helping others in distress never dies.”

=== Jewish connection ===
Rosenwald became a member of the city's leading Jewish Reform congregation, Chicago Sinai congregation, soon after moving to Chicago. The teachings of the rabbi, Emil G. Hirsch, made an impact on Rosenwald's philanthropy. Among Hirsch's main teachings regarding social justice was that wealthy individuals have a duty to help the poor, it is not an option. The poor have a right to benefit from this help.

Rosenwald donated generously to several Jewish community projects in Chicago and served as vice president of Chicago Sinai for many years.

In 1929 he offered a $10,000 prize to the writer of the best answer to the question "How can Judaism best adjust itself to and influence modern life?" The competition was won by Rabbi Mordecai Kaplan who published "Judaism as a Civilization," the most influential Jewish book of its time.

=== African American education ===
Booker T. Washington encouraged Rosenwald to address the poor state of African-American education in the U.S., which suffered from inadequate buildings and books. Rosenwald provided funds to build six small schools in rural Alabama, which were constructed and opened in 1913 and 1914, and overseen by Tuskegee. As the projects were built by and for African Americans, they showed Rosenwald's intention to remain behind the scenes in this effort. Inspired by the social progressivism of Jane Addams, Grace Abbott, Paul J. Sachs, and the Reform Judaism of Emil Hirsch and Julian Mack (many of whom were personal friends as well), Rosenwald devoted his time, energy, and money to philanthropy.

In his words, written in 1911:

The horrors that are due to race prejudice come home to the Jew more forcefully than to others of the white race, on account of the centuries of persecution which they have suffered and still suffer.

The collaboration between Booker T. Washington and Julius Rosenwald was the subject of the 2015 documentary Rosenwald, subtitled The Remarkable Story of a Jewish Partnership with African American Communities by writer, producer and director Aviva Kempner, which won Best Documentary Jury Award at the Teaneck International Film Festival and the Lipscomb University Prize of the Ecumenical Jury, Nashville Film Festival.

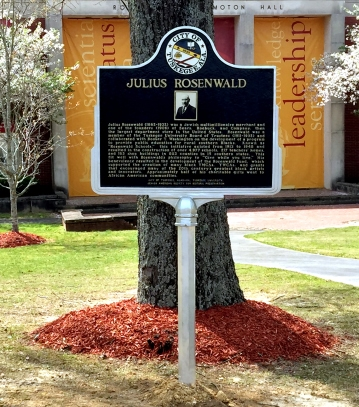
Julius Rosenwald Historical marker at the entrance to Tuskegee University.

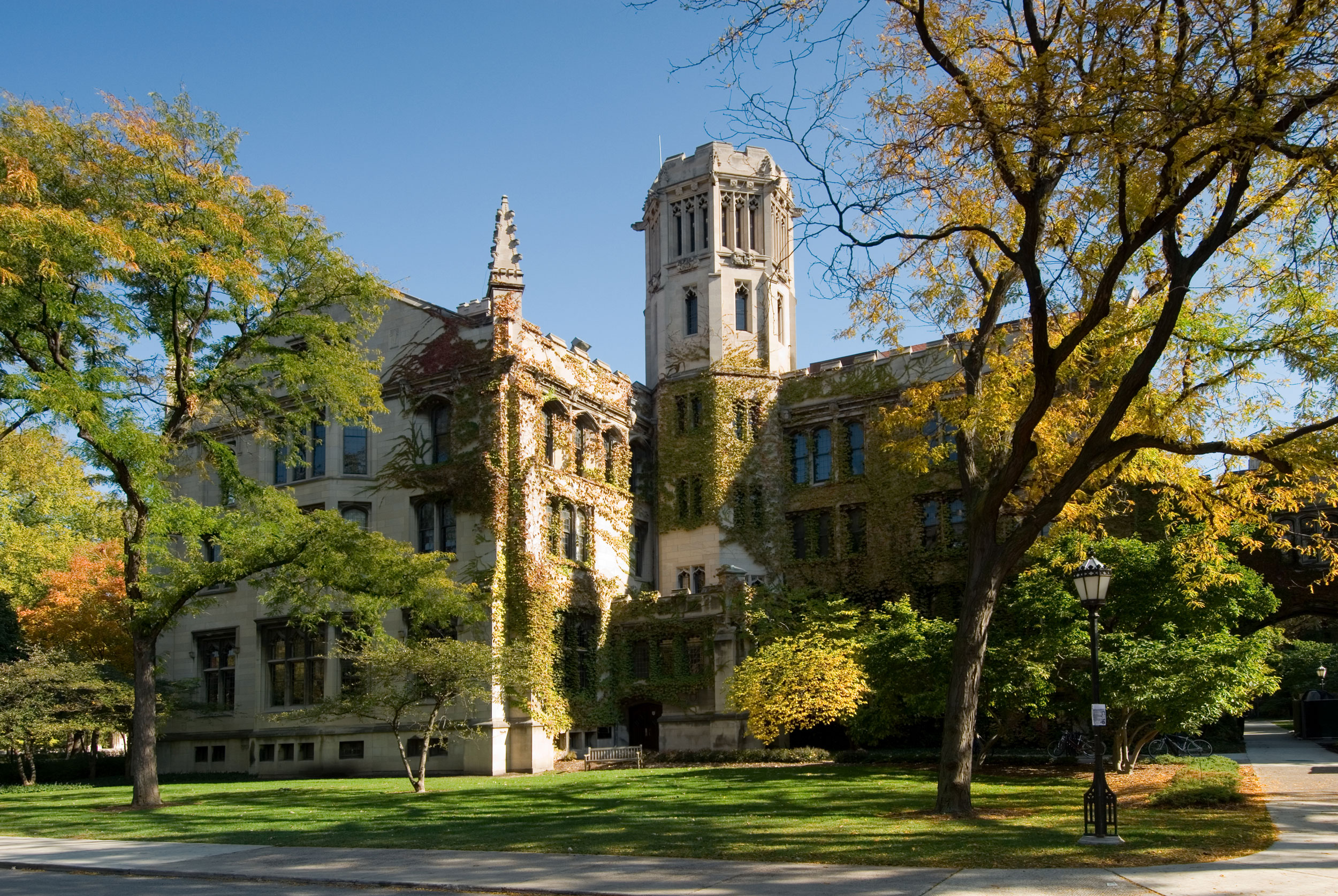
Julius Rosenwald Hall at the University of Chicago

=== Schools, universities, and museums ===
Over the course of his life, Rosenwald and his fund donated over $70 million to public schools, colleges and universities, museums, Jewish charities and African-American institutions. The rural school building program was one of the largest programs administered by the Rosenwald Fund. This program eventually was responsible for construction in the South of more than 5,000 schools and shops for African-American children, as well as homes for their teachers. These schools became informally known as "Rosenwald Schools".

==== Chicago Museum of Science and Industry ====
Rosenwald and his family had visited the Deutsches Museum of science and technology in Munich, in 1911 while in Germany and he was interested in creating a similar science museum in Chicago. He interested the Commercial Club of Chicago and involved his fellow members by pledging $3 million towards the cost of converting the Palace of Fine Arts into a science museum. Rosenwald eventually contributed more than $5 million ($118 million in 2025) to the project. The museum was often referred to as the "Rosenwald Industrial Museum", but Rosenwald declined to have his name on the building. In 1928,it became museum the Museum of Science and Industry.

==== Housing Developments ====
Rosenwald commissioned one of Chicago's largest philanthropic housing developments: the Michigan Boulevard Garden Apartments, at 47th St. and Michigan Ave. The Michigan Boulevard Garden Apartments was one of the first American housing developments to mix residential, commercial and social uses and still stands. Its name was later changed to Rosenwald Courts Apartments.

The complex was built in 1929 by Julius Rosenwald and his nephew, architect Ernest Grunsfeld (who also designed the Adler Planetarium, at the behest of Rosenwald's brother-in-law, Max Adler). Covering a square block, the buildings enclosed an enormous central landscaped courtyard. Rosenwald planned the development of 421 units to provide sound housing for African Americans and to relieve the tremendous overcrowding due to Chicago's pervasive racial segregation. The development also included 14 stores along the 47th Street side of the property, four of which were occupied by black-owned businesses, and a nursery school. Rosenwald invested $2.7 million in the project, receiving only a 2.4 percent return during the first seven years.

=== YMCAs for African Americans ===
In 1910, the YMCA asked Rosenwald to fund a proposal for a new building in Chicago; Rosenwald replied that he would contribute only if a center for African Americans were also constructed. The result was the Wabash Avenue YMCA, opened in 1914, which would later become an historic landmark. The Wabash "Y" greatly aided blacks' integration into Chicago during the Great Migration. It is still operating today.

Rosenwald went on to offer challenge grants to cities across the United States to build YMCAs for African Americans. Rosenwald promised to give $25,000 to any city that could raise $75,000 to build a YMCA for African Americans. Between 1911 and 1933, Rosenwald provided over $600,000 toward the building of 25 YMCAs in 24 cities across the United States, including one in Harlem.

=== NAACP ===
In the early days of the founding of the NAACP Rosenwald contributed several thousands of dollars to help its establishment. He also helped them find a venue for their 1912 meeting in Chicago, which was held at his synagogue, Temple Sinai. The Rosenwald Fund continued to contribute to the work of the NAACP in education and legal defense.

=== Exhibition in Washington, DC ===
The National Building Museum in Washington, DC is holding an exhibition entitled, "A Better Life for Their Children: Julius Rosenwald, Booker T. Washington, and the 4,978 Schools that Changed America." Though photographs by photographer/curator Andrew Feiler, it documents the relationship between Rosenwald and Washington this story, with interviews of former students, teachers, and community leaders, drawings, school models and videos. The exhibition is open through Jan. 2027.

=== Samuel Reshevsky ===
Rosenwald was the patron of chess prodigy Samuel Reshevsky. He encouraged Reshevsky to earn a university degree so as not to be completely dependent upon chess for his living. Reshevsky did so, earning his degree in accounting from the University of Chicago.

=== County Extension ===
Rosenwald gave $1000 grants to the first 100 counties in the U.S. to hire County Extension Agents, helping the United States Department of Agriculture launch a program that was highly valuable to rural Americans. He was also the principal founder and backer for the Museum of Science and Industry in Chicago, to which he gave over $5 million and served as the president (1927–1932).

== Death and legacy ==
Julius Rosenwald’s impact on America, via the retail revolution he created through Sears, Roebuck & Company as well as his wide-ranging philanthropy remain largely unknown, much having to do with his insistence to remain anonymous by withholding his name from the projects he funded, as well as his choice to “sunset” the Rosenwald Fund.

Rosenwald died at his home, now Rosewood Park, in the Ravinia section of Highland Park, Illinois, on January 6, 1932, aged 69.

- His bust was created in bronze, and it was among those of eight honored industry magnates which were installed between the Chicago River and the Merchandise Mart in downtown Chicago, Illinois.
- During World War II, the Liberty ship SS Julius Rosenwald was built in Panama City, Florida, and named in his honor.
- He was inducted into the Junior Achievement U.S. Business Hall of Fame in 1992.
- A 2015 film, Rosenwald, directed by Aviva Kempner documents his life and philanthropy.
- A Chicago Public School system elementary school, located at 2601 W 80th Street on Chicago's Southwest Side, was named after Rosenwald in 1952.
- Rosenwald's boyhood home, which is part of the Lincoln Home National Historic Site, was renamed in his honor in 2020. A plaque there commemorates his work.

When looking back on his life and success, Rosenwald declared, "Most people are of the opinion that because a man has made a fortune that his opinions on any subject are valuable. For my part, I always believe most large fortunes are made by men of mediocre ability who tumbled into a lucky opportunity and couldn’t help but get rich and that others, given the same chance, would have done far better with it." Thus, although Julius Rosenwald is one of Chicago's most admired Jewish businessmen, he maintained a low profile throughout his life. He refused to be the source of biographies and did not want his name to be affixed on buildings or institutions. He even insisted that his generous philanthropic contributions be matched by others so that he would not be credited with the title of 'sole donor'. However, he is well-remembered today through many books, such as Julius Rosenwald: The Man Who Built Sears, Roebuck and Advanced the Cause of Black Education in the American South by Peter M. Ascoli, and Julius Rosenwald: Repairing the World by Hasia R. Diner. A new screenplay, 5000 schools, based on his story will come out soon, directed and written by Tom Stern.

== US National Park network in his honor ==
In February 2026 U.S. Senate Democratic Whip Dick Durbin (re)introduced a bill to create the Rosenwald Schools National Historic Park network which would have national parks in honor of Julius Rosenwald in several locations, specifically Chicago, Maryland, Virginia, and South Carolina. This would also mean that the U.S. National Park Service (NPS) would provide details of Rosenwald's life at his boyhood home in Springfield, Illinois. This is already a historic site, part of the Lincoln Home National Historic Site.

In 2024 the National Park Service (NPS) submitted its recommendations to Congress in which it had identified locations for establishing a national historic site and network program to preserve the legacies of Julius Rosenwald and the Rosenwald Schools, which were so pivotal in African American education during the Jim Crow era in the Southern USA. This study was prepared beginning in 2020 after Congress directed the Secretary of the Interior to conduct a special resource study (SRS) of sites connected to Rosenwald, with a special focus on the Rosenwald Schools, to determine their potential as an addition to the National Park System.

There is an effort underway to move this forward through Congress.

== Sources and further reading ==
- Ascoli, Peter M. Julius Rosenwald: The Man Who Built Sears, Roebuck and Advanced the Cause of Black Education in the American South (Indiana University Press, 2006), a major biography. online
- Brinkmann, Tobias, "Sundays at Sinai: A Jewish Congregation in Chicago" (2012), on Rosenwald's Jewish philanthropy.
- Burton, Charles Wesley and Laura Dancy Burton, The North Star: Julius Rosenwald's Impact Upon Black America (2008)
- Diner, Hasia R. Julius Rosenwald: Repairing the World. (Yale University Press, 2017), a major biography. online
- Embree, Edwin R. Investment in People? The Story of the Julius Rosenwald Fund. 1949.
- Emmet, Boris, and John E Jeuck. Catalogs and Counters: A History of Sears, Roebuck and Company (1950), a scholarly history
- Mays, Russell O. "Julius Rosenwald: Building Partnerships for American Education." Professional Educator 28.2 (2006): 1-8. online
- Werner, M. R. Julius Rosenwald: The Life of a Practical Humanitarian. 2nd ed. 1939.
