= Chemehuevi =

Indigenous people of the Great Basin

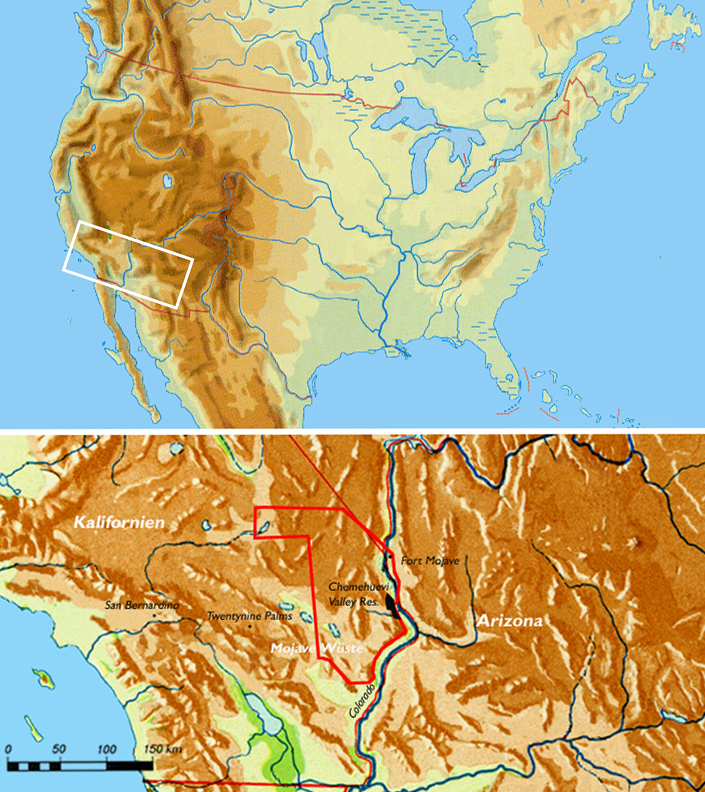
- Chemehuevi lands in California and Arizona

Total population
- 2010: 1,201 alone and in combination

Regions with significant populations
- United States (Arizona, California)

Languages
- English, Colorado River Numic (ISO 639-3, ute)

Religion
- Native American Church, Sun Dance, traditional tribal religion, Christianity, Ghost Dance

Related ethnic groups
- Southern Paiute people

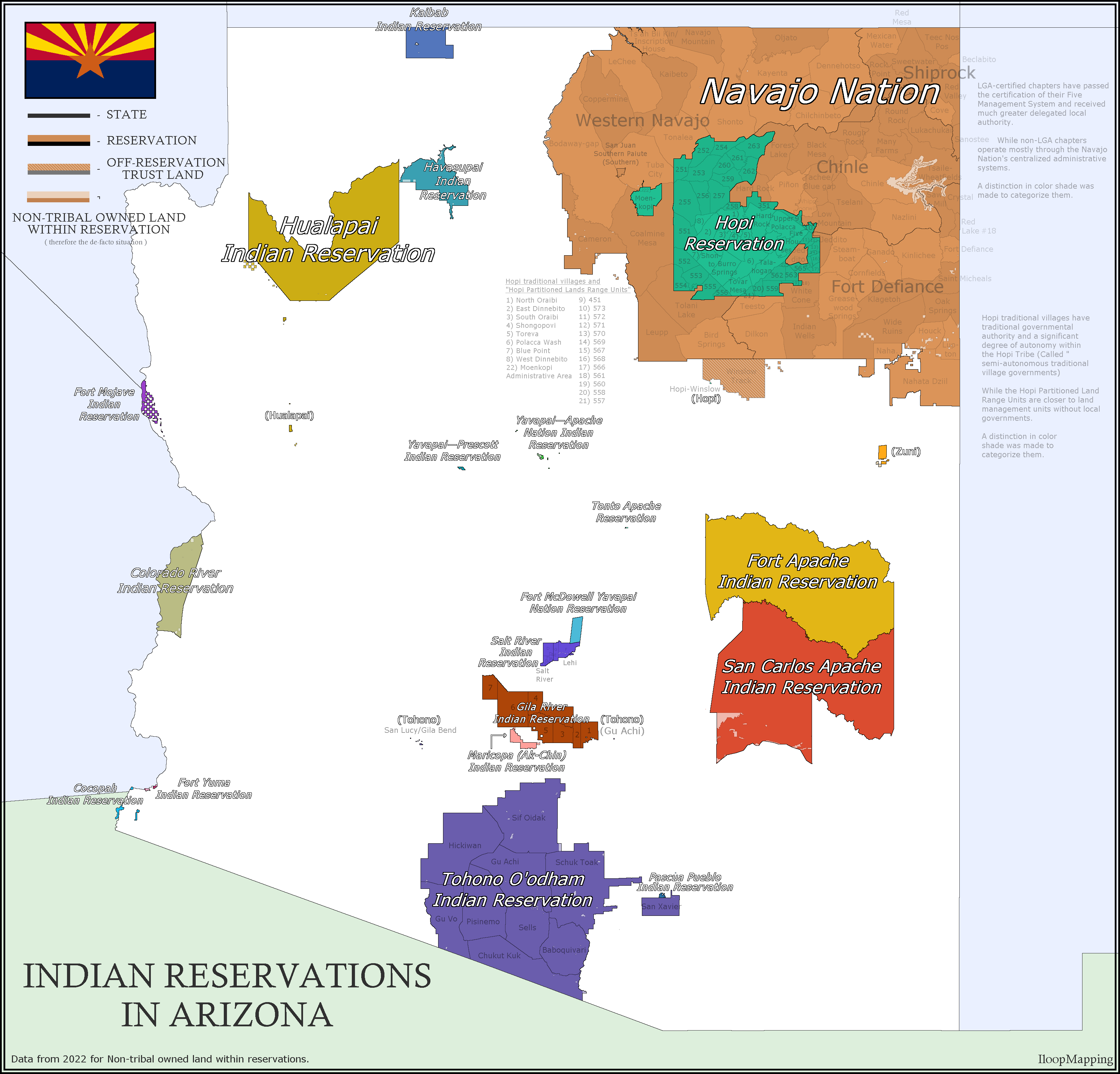
Map of the Colorado Indian River Tribes and neighboring tribes.

The Chemehuevi (English: /ˌtʃɛməˈweɪvi/ CHEH-mə-WAY-vee) are an Indigenous people of the Great Basin. They are the southernmost branch of Southern Paiute. Today, Chemehuevi people are enrolled in the following federally recognized tribes:

- Colorado River Indian Tribes
- Chemehuevi Indian Tribe of the Chemehuevi Reservation
- Morongo Band of Mission Indians
- Cabazon Band of Mission Indians
- Agua Caliente Band of Cahuilla Indians
- Torres-Martinez Desert Cahuilla Indians
- Twenty-Nine Palms Band of Mission Indians of California

Some Chemehuevi are also part of the Soboba Band of Luiseño Indians, whose members are mostly Sovovatum or Soboba band members of Cahuilla and Luiseño people.

== Name ==
"Chemehuevi" has multiple interpretations. It is considered to be either a Mojave term meaning "those who play with fish" or a Quechan word meaning "nose-in-the-air-like-a-roadrunner." The Chemehuevi call themselves Nüwüvi ("The People", singular Nüwü) or Tantáwats, meaning "Southern Men." Alternate spellings of Chemehuevi include Chemeguab and Chemegueb.

== Language ==
Their language, Chemehuevi, is a Colorado River Numic language, in the Numic language branch of the Uto-Aztecan language family. First transcribed by John P. Harrington and Carobeth Laird in the early 20th century, it was studied in the 1970s by linguist Margaret L. Press. whose field notes and extensive sound recordings remain available. The language is now near extinction; during the filming of Ironbound Films' 2008 American documentary film The Linguists, linguists Greg Anderson and K. David Harrison interviewed and recorded one of the last 3 remaining speakers.

In 2015, the Siwavaats Junior College in Havasu Lake, California, was established to teach children the language. A Chemehuevi dictionary with 2,500 words was expected to become available in 2016.

== History and traditional culture ==
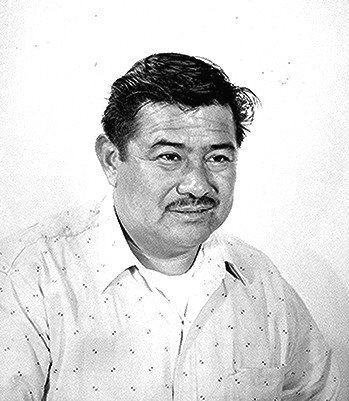
McKinley Fisher, a Chemehuevi man employed by the Indian Service at Colorado Agency, Arizona in 1957.

The Chemehuevi were originally a desert tribe among the Southern Paiute group. Post-contact, they lived primarily in the eastern Mojave Desert and later Cottonwood Island in Nevada and the Chemehuevi Valley along the Colorado River in California. They were a nomadic people living in small groups given the sparse resources available in the desert environment. Carobeth Laird indicates their traditional territory spanned the High Desert from the Colorado River on the east to the Tehachapi Mountains on the west and from the Las Vegas area and Death Valley on the north to the San Bernardino and San Gabriel Mountains in the south. They are most closely identified as among the Great Basin Indians. Among others they are cousins of the Kawaiisu.

The most comprehensive collection of Chemehuevi history, culture and mythology was gathered by Carobeth Laird (1895–1983) and her second husband, George Laird, one of the last Chemehuevi to have been raised in the traditional culture. Carobeth Laird, a linguist and ethnographer, wrote a comprehensive account of the culture and language as George Laird remembered it, and published their collaborative efforts in her 1976 The Chemehuevis, the first – and, to date, only – ethnography of the Chemehuevi traditional culture.

Describing the Chemehuevi as she knew them, and presenting the texture of traditional life amongst the people, Carobeth Laird writes:

The Chemehuevi character is made up of polarities which are complementary rather than contradictory. They are loquacious yet capable of silence; gregarious yet so close to the earth that single families or even men alone might live and travel for long periods away from other human beings; proud, yet capable of a gentle self-ridicule. They are conservative to a degree, yet insatiably curious and ready to inquire into and even to adopt new ways: to visit all tribes, whether friends or enemies; to speak strange tongues, sing strange songs, and marry strange wives.

The Chemehuevi made intricately coiled baskets using a three-rod foundation of willow. Traditionally, the majority of weaving was completed with split willow, and darker patterns were made with devil's claw and yucca, among other materials. This traditional style of basketmaking is currently practiced by a small group of weavers.

== Population ==
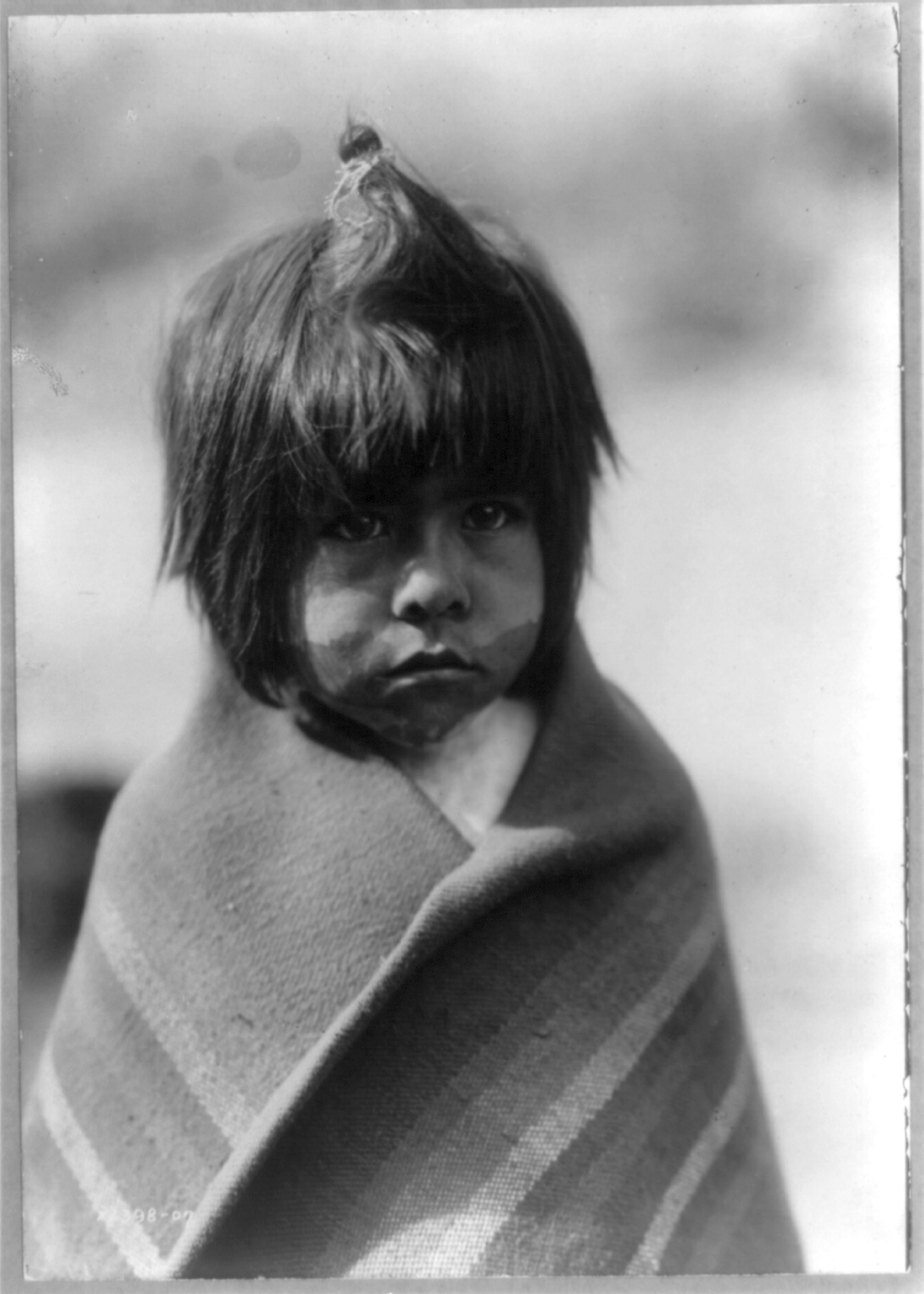
Chemehuevi boy by Edward S. Curtis

Estimates for the pre-contact populations of most Indigenous peoples of California have varied substantially. Alfred L. Kroeber estimated the combined 1770 population of the Chemehuevi, Koso, and Kawaiisu as 1,500. The combined estimate in 1910 dropped to 500. An Indian agent reported the Chemehuevi population in 1875 to be 350. Kroeber estimated U.S. census data put the Chemehuevi population in 1910 as 355. Population as of 2016 is in the thousands.

== Bands ==
- Howaits (Hokwaits, lived in the Ivanpah Mountains, called Ivanpah Mountain Group)
- Kauyaichits (lived in the area of Ash Meadows, called Ash Meadows Group)
- Mokwats (lived in the Kingston Mountains, called Kingston Mountain Group)
- Moviats (Movweats, lived on Cottonwood Island, called Cottonwood Island Group)
- Palonies ((in Spanish) "the bald-headed", traveled to the area north of Los Angeles)
- Shivawach (one group of them lived at Twentynine Palms, the second one in Chemehuevi Valley)
- Tümplsagavatsits (Timpashauwagotsits, lived in the Providence Mountains, therefore called Providence Mountain Group)
- Yagats (lived in the Amargosa Valley and along the Amargosa River, called Amargosa River Group)

== See also ==
- Chemehuevi traditional narratives
- Classification of Indigenous peoples of the Americas
