= Jack Daulton =

American lawyer

- Born: James Daulton; October 30, 1956 (age 70)
- Citizenship: United States
- Education: University of California, Berkeley (BS, JD)
- Occupations: Art historian, art collector, trial lawyer
- Known for: The Daulton Collection
- Website: www.thedaultoncollection.comwww.symbolismus.com www.gabrielvonmax.com

James (Jack) Daulton (born October 30, 1956), also known as Nyi Nyi Min (Burmese: ညီညီမင်း), is an American art collector, trial lawyer, music entrepreneur, exploration philanthropist, and expert and lecturer on the history of art and architecture. Daulton rose to fame representing the nation of Myanmar in the groundbreaking 1994 legal case, United States v. Richard Diran and The Union of Myanmar, successfully recovering a 1,000-year-old Buddha statue that had been stolen in 1988 from a temple in Myanmar's ancient capital, Bagan, a treasure now on display in the National Museum in Yangon. This was the first cultural property claim litigated by a Southeast Asian nation in the United States. Daulton has also gained recognition as a result of The Daulton Collection–his vast art collection which includes one of the world's largest private collections of German Symbolist art and, in particular, the world's largest private collection of works by a number of individual artists, such as the eccentric monkey painter Gabriel von Max, the Austrian symbolist Rudolf Jettmar, and the German illustrator, painter, and proto-hippie Fidus. Among The Daulton Collection's highlights are masterpieces of symbolist portraiture, including Karl Gussow's Portrait of the Novelist Ossip Schubin (1887), Rudolf Jettmar's Self-Portrait of the Young Artist (1896), and Oskar Zwintscher's The Woman in Hamster (Portrait of the Artist's Wife, Adele, wearing a Hamster Jacket) (1914), currently on long-term loan to the Albertinum, Staatliche Kunstsammlungen, the museum of modern art in Dresden. In 2021, a painting from The Daulton Collection, Gabriel von Max's Abelard and Heloise, was the "face" of the major exhibition at the Musée d'Orsay, Paris, "Les Origines du Monde: L'invention de la nature au XIXe siècle" ("The Origins of the World: The Invention of Nature in the 19th Century"). In addition, Daulton is well known as an expert on non-western art, architecture, and religion, and acclaimed for his many lectures on those subjects for institutions such as National Geographic, The American Museum of Natural History, and The Art Institute of Chicago. He is also well known for his activity in exploration philanthropy, funding research expeditions around the globe, from archaeological digs in the Peruvian Andes to language documentation projects on remote atolls in Micronesia. And as an art and entertainment lawyer in the 1990s, Daulton developed the major-label rock band Kill Hannah, among other recording artists.

== Early life and education ==
Born in San Francisco, California, Daulton is of English-Scottish and Spanish descent. On his father's side, Daulton's family had settled in British America by the 17th century; and he is a direct descendant of American Revolutionary War soldier Moses Daulton (1760–1819), who enlisted at the age of 15 (3rd Virginia Regiment, Continental Army) and fought at the Battle of Trenton (1776), among other engagements. On his mother's side, Daulton's grandparents, Antonio Espinosa Perez and Josefa Aragon Rodriguez, were Andalusian, from small villages in the Province of Granada, Spain; in 1907, as part of the Spanish immigration to Hawaii, their families relocated to Hawai'i (the Big Island), where they paid off their passage by laboring for three years in the sugarcane plantations before moving to California.

Daulton attended Wheeling High School in Wheeling, Illinois, where he was a valedictorian of his graduating class in 1974. He received his B.S., with honors, from the University of California at Berkeley in 1978 and his J.D. from the UC Berkeley School of Law in 1981. Later, in the early 1990s, Daulton attended graduate school at Northern Illinois University where he studied the history of Southeast Asian art under the supervision of Professor Richard Cooler, then Director of the U. S. Center for Burma studies, and, having been awarded a FLAS fellowship, studied the Burmese language under the supervision of Professor Saya U Saw Tun. Daulton's classmates in art history at NIU included Alexandra Green, now curator for Southeast Asia at the British Museum, London, and Jennifer Tonkovich, now Eugene and Clare Thaw Curator of Drawings and Prints at the Morgan Library & Museum, New York. During his time at NIU, Daulton undertook fieldwork in Myanmar and India, researching, documenting, and publishing, in the Journal of Burma Studies, the story of the Relics of Sariputta and Moggallana, the Buddha's two chief disciples, at the Kaba Aye Pagoda in Yangon, Myanmar.

== Legal Case Recovering Stolen Buddha ==
In 1995, as a cultural property lawyer, Daulton recovered a 1000-year-old Buddha statue that had been stolen from a temple in Bagan, Myanmar.

In 1988, in Myanmar (Burma), during a period of civil unrest associated with the burgeoning democracy movement, a period when some remote archaeological sites were left unattended, thieves opportunistically broke into the 11th-century Kyauk-ku-umin Temple in Bagan, Myanmar's ancient capital city, and stole several 1000-year-old sandstone statues of the Buddha. There was no knowledge of the whereabouts of the stolen statues until 1991, when one of the statues, a 22-inch standing figure of the Buddha in dharmachakra mudra (the Buddha preaching his First Sermon), appeared in a Sotheby's catalogue, slated for sale at auction in New York City on October 28, 1991. Art dealer Richard K. Diran of San Francisco, who claimed to have purchased the statue in Bangkok, had consigned the statue to Sotheby's for auction. An astute anonymous observer recognized the statue as one of the stolen Buddha images (a photograph showing the statue in situ in its temple niche had been published years earlier in an academic text and the statue had a preexisting and identifying break just above the knees). Upon this discovery, Sotheby's was informed, and it withdrew the statue from the sale, and, in turn, contacted the FBI. The FBI impounded the statue and conducted an investigation. After considering the possibility of a criminal prosecution for trafficking in stolen property, the United States Department of Justice, on August 15, 1994, instead initiated a civil proceeding, known as an interpleader proceeding, in the United States District Court for the Southern District of New York, for the purpose of determining who was the rightful owner of the Buddha statue—the country of Myanmar or art dealer Richard K. Diran. That legal proceeding, United States v. Richard K. Diran and The Union of Myanmar, 94 CIV. 5898, was assigned to U.S. District Judge John E. Sprizzo. Jack Daulton represented Myanmar (through Myanmar's Permanent Representative to the United Nations) in the litigation, on a pro bono basis. Dr. Richard Cooler, Professor of Art History at Northern Illinois University, and Director of the Center for Burma studies, provided expert assistance in connection with the case.

The case presented some interesting legal questions of, among other issues, state immunity (foreign sovereign immunity) and Choice of law (Myanmar, Thailand, or USA). As a threshold matter, in order to participate in the proceeding (through joinder as a nominal defendant), Myanmar, relying upon Daulton's legal opinion, had to agree to a limited waiver of its immunity, and submission to the jurisdiction of the U.S. District Court, for sole purposes of the interpleader proceeding. This case was the first time, and perhaps the only time, that Myanmar has waived its immunity to suit in a U.S. court. Notably, this case also was the first time that a Southeast Asian nation litigated a cultural property claim in the U.S. After a period of acrimonious litigation, Diran agreed unconditionally to relinquish his claim to the Buddha statue. And, in 1995, Judge Sprizzo entered a consent decree, drafted by Daulton, adjudicating that Myanmar held full and exclusive ownership of the Buddha statue.

Following the successful conclusion of the litigation, and pursuant to Daulton's pro bono agreement with Myanmar, the Buddha statue was placed on exhibition for one year at the Northern Illinois University Art Museum. Eventually, the statue made its way back to Myanmar where it is now the centerpiece of the new Buddhist art gallery at the National Museum of Myanmar (Yangon).

== The Daulton Collection ==
The Daulton Collection is an eclectic collection of art and artifacts from all over the world. The current acquisitional focus of the collection is German symbolist art; and the collection has been called the world's "most important collection of symbolist art from Germany and Austria." The Daulton Collection contains many notable works, including "Waldhexe" ("Witch of the Woods") by the pioneering modernist painter Julie Wolfthorn, as well as the largest collection of Gabriel von Max works in the world (including 13 of his famous oil paintings of monkeys). Artworks from the collection have been featured in more than 30 exhibitions in Europe (Germany, Austria, Italy, France, the Czech Republic) and the US. For example, a 2011 exhibition at the Frye Art Museum in Seattle, Washington, entitled "Gabriel von Max: Be-tailed Cousins and Phantasms of the Soul," centered upon a loan of more than fifty of The Daulton Collection's many works by the artist. And, more recently, in 2025, The Daulton Collection loaned 38 works of art to the Leopold Museum in Vienna as part of the groundbreaking exhibition "Hidden Modernism: The Fascination with the Occult Around 1900." In addition to short-term exhibition loans, the Collection has paintings and drawings on long-term, continuing loan to a number of museums around the world, including the Albertinum museum, Dresden (two paintings); the Leopold Museum, Vienna (nine paintings and two drawings); the Museum Wiesbaden, Wiesbaden (two paintings); and the Memorial Art Gallery, University of Rochester, New York (one painting). Daulton has also gifted artworks to museums, including, in 2024, a drawing by artist Adolf Hirémy-Hirschl to the Instituto Centrale per la Grafica, Ministerio della Cultura (Ministry of Culture (Italy), Rome; in 2000, ten prints by German symbolist artist Max Klinger to the Art Institute of Chicago; and, in 1998, three artworks from Tibet and Cambodia to the Art Gallery of Greater Victoria, British Columbia.

== Exploration Philanthropy ==
With his partner, software executive Roz Ho, Daulton has funded research expeditions around the globe, particularly in the fields of archaeology and linguistics. Expeditions funded by Daulton include the following:

- July 2013, Micronesian Linguistics Expedition: expedition to document endangered languages on remote islands in Micronesia, including Mwoakilloa Atoll. This expedition was organized by the Living Tongues Institute for Endangered Languages (Dr. K. David Harrison and Dr. Gregory Anderson (linguist), expedition leaders). Daulton was also a member of the expedition team as an ethnographic interviewer and photographer.
- July–August 2016, Wiracochan Archeological expedition: expedition to excavate, survey, and map Inca and pre-Inca sites on a mountain called Wiracochan in the Vilcabamba mountain range of the Peruvian Andes (Peter Frost expedition leader).
- November 2017, Arunachal Pradesh Linguistics Expedition: expedition to document endangered languages in the remote northwest area of Arunachal Pradesh State, India, in particular the Sartang language of West Kameng district (Dr. Gregory Anderson (linguist), expedition leader). Daulton was also a member of the expedition team as an ethnographer and photographer.
- July 2018, Pico Cão Grande Climbing Expedition: expedition to make the first American free climb of Pico Cão Grande, a 1,200-foot volcanic spire arising from the rainforest on Sao Tome (Island) off of the equatorial coast of west Africa.

Daulton and his partner Roz Ho, as executive producers, also funded short documentary films arising out of the Wiracochan and Pico Cão Grande expeditions: “Vilcabamba – A Sacred Valley,” 2018, directors Kyle McBurnie and Kevin Floerke; “Nubivagant 360 VR,” 2019, director Jacob Kupferman (Official Selection Horsetooth International Film Festival 2019, Official Selection Edmonton Short Film Festival 2019, Official Selection and Finalist NZ Web Fest 2019, Official Selection Woodbury Film Festival 2020, Official Selection and Best VR Documentary FAFF Fine Arts Film Festival 2020, Venice Institute of Contemporary Art, Venice, CA, and Official Selection New Media Film Festival Los Angeles 2021); "Why We Climb," director Jacob Kupferman (Finalist, 2019 Roam Awards, Colorado); and "Nubivigant," director Jacob Kupferman (Official Selection Boulder Environmental/Nature/Outdoor Film Festival 2020 and Official Selection Frozen River Film Festival, Winona, MN, 2021).

Daulton and his partner Roz Ho have also provided financial support to paleoanthropological research and exploration undertaken by the Institute of Human Origins (Donald Johanson, founding director), Arizona State University, where Daulton is on the Research Council, and at the Turkana Basin Institute (Louise Leakey, director), Stony Brook University. In addition, Daulton has provided significant funding to the Last Mile Technology Program (photographer Chris Rainier, director), supplying indigenous groups with modern technology to document their traditional culture.

Daulton is a member of the Explorers Club.

== Personal life ==
Daulton currently resides in Los Altos Hills, California with his longtime partner, pioneering software executive Roz Ho. He has two children: Melanie, a doctor; and Sam, a scientist.
