= Rosenwald (film) =

- Film poster
- Directed by: Aviva Kempner
- Written by: Aviva Kempner
- Cinematography: Christopher Conder; Roger Grange; Chapin Hall; Mel Henry; Tom Kaufman; Dana Kupper; Stephan Mazurek; Michael Moser; Mirko Popadic; Allen Rosen
- Edited by: Marian Sears Hunter
- Release dates: February 25, 2015 (Washington Jewish Film Festival); August 14, 2015
- Running time: 100 minutes
- Country: United States
- Language: English
- Box office: $433,924

Rosenwald: A Remarkable Story of a Jewish Partnership with African American Communities is a 2015 documentary film written and directed by Aviva Kempner about the career of American businessman and philanthropist Julius Rosenwald. It debuted on February 25, 2015 at the Washington Jewish Film Festival.

== Plot ==
The documentary features interviews with a number of people, including Peter Ascoli, grandson and biographer of Rosenwald, civil rights leader Julian Bond, Stephanie Deutsch, Richard J. Powell, journalist Eugene Robinson and director George C. Wolfe.

The film begins with an account of Rosenwald's rise from a job in the clothing business of his father, a German-Jewish immigrant, to the chairmanship of Sears-Roebuck. He built the company into the world's largest retailer. Shocked by reports of anti-Jewish pogroms in Russia, he realizes that America's treatment of Negroes is no better and marshals his fortune to improving their condition.

He develops a friendship with Booker T. Washington, donates money as a philanthropist to Tuskegee Institute, and helps support a model project for Tuskegee architects to design and the school staff to oversee operation of simple schoolhouses intended for the rural South.

After Washington's death in 1915, Rosenwald set up his Rosenwald Foundation in 1917 to expand the scale of the school construction project; the foundation primarily funded rural schools for African-American children in the South. It was based on offering matching construction funds to communities, and gaining white school board approval and commitment for operating funds. Local communities conducted fundraising and sweat equity participation, with some also donating land for these schools. By Rosenwald's death in 1932, some 5,357 of the informally named Rosenwald schools had been built. They comprised about one-third of all elementary schools available for African Americans prior to the 1954 US Supreme Court ruling in Brown vs. Board of Education that segregated public schools were unconstitutional.

Other Rosenwald-supported projects depicted in the film include establishing 25 YMCA-YWCAs for African Americans, founding the Museum of Science and Industry, building the Michigan Boulevard Garden Apartments, a housing project for some of the many blacks moving to Chicago in the Great Migration; and helped pay for the training of the Tuskegee Airmen. The documentary concludes by chronicling the influence of the Rosenwald Fund, which awarded grants to many black artists and writers in the mid-twentieth century, including numerous African Americans who have become well known.

== Reception ==
=== Box office ===
The film had grossed $412,511 as of 5 November 2015.

=== Critical reception ===
The documentary has received positive reviews from critics. On Rotten Tomatoes, the film has a rating of 93%, based on 30 reviews, with an average rating of 7.8/10. On Metacritic, Rosenwald has a score of 67 out of a 100, based on 12 critics, indicating "generally favorable reviews".

Positive reviewers included The Wall Street Journal, The Christian Science Monitor, and RogerEbert.com.

== Accolades ==
- Nominated for Grand Jury Prize at the 2015 Nashville Film Festival.
