= The Anthropologist (film) =

- Directed by: Seth Kramer; Daniel A. Miller; Jeremy Newberger
- Written by: Daniel A. Miller
- Produced by: Seth Kramer; Daniel A. Miller; Jeremy Newberger
- Starring: Mary Catherine Bateson; Susan Crate; Katie Yegorov-Crate
- Cinematography: Simon Compain; Roger Tibbetts Grange, III; Seth Kramer; Dave Messick; Richard Patterson; Rodney Patterson; Graham Wright
- Edited by: Seth Kramer
- Music by: Peter Rundquist; Dar Williams
- Production company: Ironbound Films
- Release date: November 13, 2015 (DOC NYC)
- Running time: 80 minutes
- Countries: United States; Russia; Peru; Kiribati
- Language: English

The Anthropologist is a 2015 American documentary film directed by Seth Kramer, Daniel A. Miller, and Jeremy Newberger of Ironbound Films. The film follows environmental anthropologist Susie Crate and her teenage daughter Katie as they visit indigenous communities threatened by climate change. Featuring commentary from Mary Catherine Bateson, daughter of famed anthropologist Margaret Mead, the film explores how human beings adapt to catastrophic change.

== Synopsis ==
The Anthropologist tells the parallel stories of Margaret Mead, who in the twentieth century popularized cultural anthropology around the world, and Susie Crate, an environmental anthropologist currently studying the impact of climate change.

Mead and Crate’s daughters are the film’s storytellers. Mead’s daughter is Mary Catherine Bateson, a 76-year-old cultural anthropologist. Crate’s daughter is Katie Yegorov-Crate, a teenager who begrudgingly travels with her mother. During the film, shot over the course of five years, Katie ages from 13 to 18.

The film weaves together accounts of humanity’s struggle with change, whether environmental, societal, or individual. Susie and Katie travel to Siberia, the South Pacific, the Andes, and the Virginia coast of the Chesapeake Bay. As a result of global warming, the communities they visit are forced to rethink how they live and whether it makes sense to move.

Mary Catherine Bateson talks about how her mother Margaret Mead also studied people facing unprecedented change, but that resulting from modernity, globalization, and war. Mary Catherine’s insights on how those communities adapted provide context for what Susie and Katie discover.

Katie also faces change in her own life. In Siberia, where Susie met Katie’s father while doing research, Katie’s family confronts the prospect of relocating from land it has occupied for centuries. At first hostile towards accompanying her mother on expeditions, Katie appreciates learning of similar struggles among other peoples of the world. Katie begins to learn the value and tools of her mother’s trade.

== Reception ==
The Anthropologist is a follow-up to Kramer, Miller, and Newberger’s The Linguists, which premiered at the 2008 Sundance Film Festival, aired on PBS, and was nominated for an Emmy Award in 2010. Both films were funded by the National Science Foundation (NSF). On April 7, 2014, when Representative Lamar Smith (R-Texas), a climate change denier, learned that NSF had funded The Anthropologist, he demanded “every e-mail, letter, memorandum, record, note [and] text message” regarding the project.

The Anthropologist world premiered at DOC NYC on November 13, 2015, to positive reviews. Called “the new guard of enviro-docs” by Realscreen, it was ranked by Indiewire among the top ten films of the festival. “A fresh look at the world (and applications) of anthropology,” Indiewire wrote, “‘The Anthropologist’ combines a uniquely human story with a new take on how to use an ever-evolving science.”

The Anthropologist was invited to screen at the UN Climate Change Conference COP21 in Paris on December 7, 2015, followed by a debate at UNESCO Headquarters. On February 18, 2016, more than 25 universities and theaters simultaneously screened the film for World Anthropology Day.
