= Anthropology (disambiguation) =

Anthropology is the science of humans.

Anthropology or Anthropologie may also refer to:

- Philosophical anthropology, branch of anthropology and philosophy
- "Anthropology" (composition), a jazz standard composed by Charlie Parker and Dizzy Gillespie
- Anthropology: And a Hundred Other Stories, a short story collection by Dan Rhodes
- Anthropologie, a chain of retail stores

== See also ==
- Anthropologist, a person who practices anthropology
- The Anthropologist (film), a 2015 documentary
- National Museum of Anthropology (disambiguation)
- Anthroponymy, the study of personal names
