= Anthropoid =

Anthropoid means 'ape/human feature' and may refer to:

- Simian, monkeys and apes (anthropoids, or suborder Anthropoidea, in earlier classifications)
- Anthropoid apes, apes that are closely related to humans (e.g., former family Pongidae and sometimes also Hylobatidae and their extinct relatives)
- Anthropoides, a genus of cranes
- Operation Anthropoid, the codename for the assassination of Reinhard Heydrich, SS-Obergruppenführer and Reichsprotektor of Bohemia and Moravia
  - Operation Anthropoid Memorial, Libeň, Prague, Czech Republic
  - Anthropoid (film), a 2016 film based on Operation Anthropoid
- In pelvimetry, one of four types of human female pelvis
- Anthropoid robots, mostly referred to as androids meaning human-like robots
- Anthropoid ceramic coffins, coffins of the Late Bronze Age Levant with human features that date from the 14th to 10th centuries BCE

== See also ==
- Anthropology (disambiguation)
- Anthropod (disambiguation)
- Humanoid (disambiguation)
