= Enduring Voices =

Enduring Voices is a project for documenting world's endangered languages and trying to prevent language extinction by identifying the most crucial areas where languages are endangered and embarking on expeditions to record these languages. Launched in 2007 by the joint effort of the Living Tongues Institute for Endangered Languages and the National Geographic Society, it has organized expeditions to language "hotspots" around the world, e.g. to Australia, Bolivia, East India. Enduring Voices tries to understand the geographic dimensions of language distribution, determine how linguistic diversity is linked to biodiversity and bring wider attention to the issue of language loss. The Enduring Voices Project assists indigenous communities in their efforts to revitalize and maintain their threatened languages.

The Language Hotspots model for prioritizing language research was conceived and developed by Dr. Greg Anderson and K. David Harrison at the Living Tongues Institute for Endangered Languages to identify most endangered and least studied languages. It is a new way to view the distribution of global linguistic diversity, to assess the threat of language extinction, and to. Hotspots are those regions of the world having the greatest linguistic diversity, the greatest language endangerment, and the least-studied languages. For the project, Doctors Anderson and Harrison are accompanied by Chris Rainier, a National Geographic Fellow and ethnographic photographer and filmmaker for helping in documenting various linguistic expedition on camera and film.

Identified hotspots with degrees of threat of language extinction include:

- Severe: North West Pacific Plateau (USA), Central South America, Central Siberia, Eastern Siberia and Northern Australia
- High: Oklahoma Southwest, Southern South America,
- Medium: Northern South America, Western Melanesia
- Low: MesoAmerica, Western Africa, Eastern Africa, Southern Africa, Caucasus, Eastern India and Malaysia, SouthEast Asia, Eastern Melanesia and Taiwan-Philippines.

In each of these areas, Enduring Voices has identified languages as priorities for research before it is too late.

Through the efforts of the Enduring Voices Project, the Koro language was discovered in India in 2008. During a three-week trip in 2009, the Enduring Voices team recorded interviews with speakers of eleven indigenous languages of Papua New Guinea.

== See also ==
- Language death
- Language documentation
- Language revival
