= Chemehuevi Indian Tribe of the Chemehuevi Reservation =

Indian tribe in California, United States

Chemehuevi Indian Tribe
Total population
- 700 enrolled members, 300 living on reservation

Regions with significant populations
- United States (Arizona, California)

Languages
- Colorado River Numic language, English

Religion
- Native American Church, Sun Dance, traditional tribal religion, Christianity, Ghost Dance

Related ethnic groups
- other Chemehuevi people

The Chemehuevi Indian Tribe of the Chemehuevi Reservation (Colorado River Numic language: Nüwüwü) is a federally recognized tribe of Chemehuevi people, who are the southernmost branch of Southern Paiute people.

To celebrate their organization under the Indian Reorganization Act, tribal recognition, and ratifying their constitution, the tribe hosts Nuwuvi Days, an annual festival held during the first weekend in June.

== Reservation ==
Location of Chemehuevi Reservation

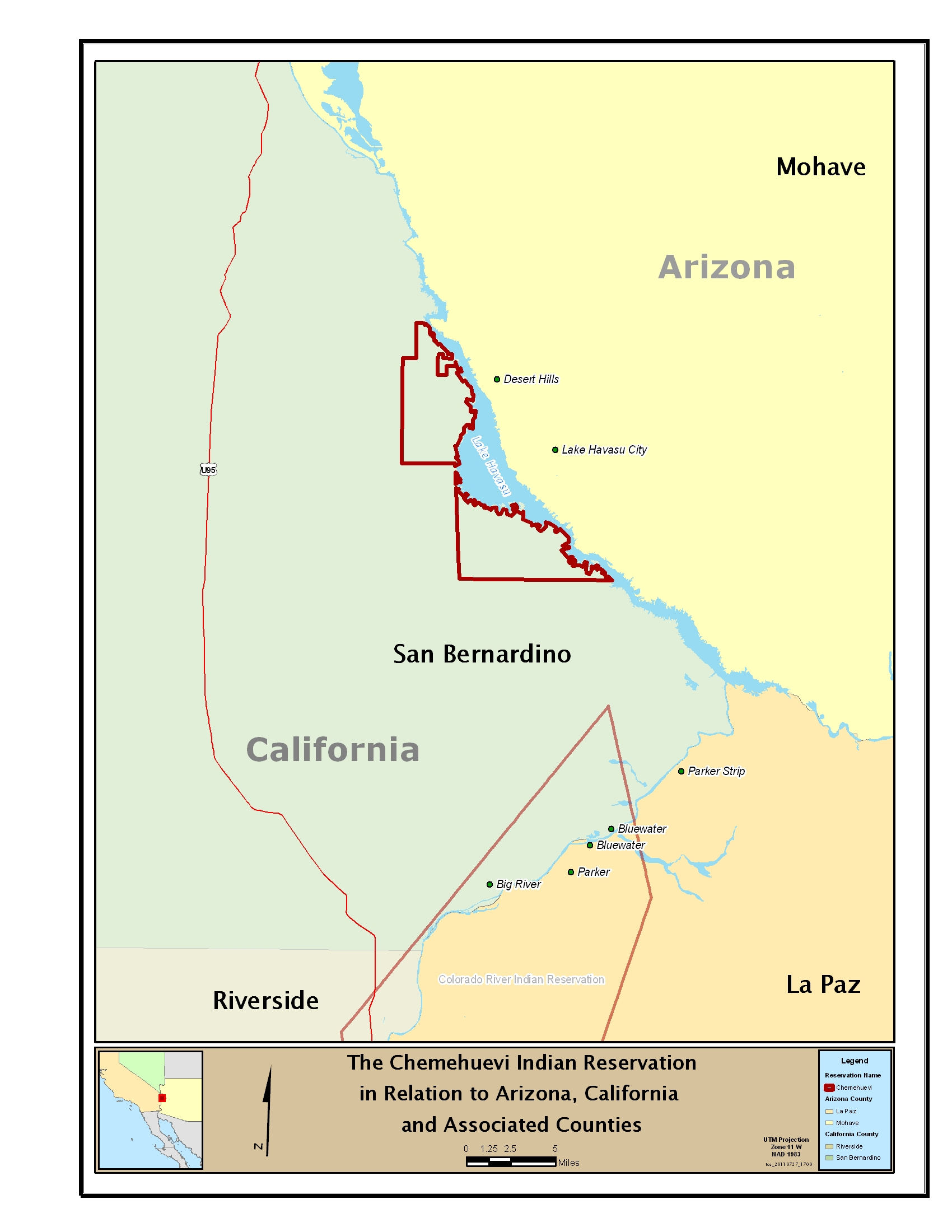
The Chemehuevi Reservation borders the western shore of Lake Havasu

The Chemehuevi Reservation (34°24′42″N 114°21′21″W) is located in San Bernardino County, California, bordering Lake Havasu for 25 miles (40 km) and along the Colorado River. The reservation is 30,653 acres (12,405 ha) large and has a population of 345.

== Government ==
The Chemehuevi Indian Tribe's headquarters is located in Havasu Lake, California. The tribe is governed by a democratically elected, nine-member tribal council.

== Economic development ==
The tribe owns and operates Havasu Landing Resort, Casino and Hotel on Lake Havasu, near Needles, California.

== Cemetery ==
The Chemehuevi Indian Cemetery is located at 34°07′44″N 116°31′14″W.
