= Helen Covensky =

Polish-American painter (1925–2007)

- Born: Hanka Ciesla; 1925; Kielce, Poland.
- Died: 2007 (aged 81–82)

Helen Covensky (1925–2007), also known by her given name Hanka Ciesla, was a Polish-American painter. A Holocaust survivor, she was born in Poland and evaded Nazi capture during World War II by traveling to Germany. Following the war, she immigrated to Detroit, Michigan in 1949 where she began a career in painting.

== Early life ==
Born in Kielce into a Jewish family in 1925, Covensky moved to Sosnowiec at a young age. There, she and her family were threatened during the German Invasion of Poland in 1939, and Covensky obtained false identification papers from her father who believed her blonde hair and green eyes would enable her to pass as a gentile. While Covensky evaded capture, she was subjected to work in a German labor camp building military equipment. The rest of her immediate family was transported to Auschwitz, where her parents and sister were killed. Her brother David Chase (Born Dudek Ciesla) survived, and the siblings were reunited after the war.

== Life after World War II ==
After World War II, Covensky married the American military journalist Harold Kempner and lived in Berlin, where she worked for the United Nations Relief and Rehabilitation Administration. In 1949, she emigrated to the United States. Covensky had two children with Harold Kempner, though the pair divorced in 1959. She later remarried Milton Covensky. She attended Wayne State University and pursued a career in art. By the early 1970s her oils were displayed in museums in the United States and Israel.

== American painting career ==
In the United States, Covensky explored her interest in painting at Wayne State University during the late 1950s and 1960s. Covensky took up painting professionally in 1967, partly motivated by the Six-Day War. She took inspiration from Eastern European aesthetics, particularly from the flora of her childhood life in Poland. Stylistically, Covensky's works were abstract and expressionist, particularly emphasizing the dynamic process of creating each painting. When discussing her work, she highlighted the contrast between her experiences of war and discrimination during her childhood with relative acceptance and growth in the United States. She opened a one woman exhibit at Detroit Institute of Arts in 1981, and her art was displayed at New York and Tel Aviv galleries as well as in Washington, DC at the Kreeger Museum.

== Legacy ==
In 2023, Covensky's daughter Aviva Kempner produced "A Pocketful of Miracles: A Tale of Two Siblings", a documentary cataloging the lives of Covensky and her brother David Chase. Also in 2023, Covensky's artwork was exhibited posthumously in Washington, DC together with that of her granddaughter, Piera Kempner.

Her papers are archived in the Archives of American Art.
