= The Life and Times of Hank Greenberg =

- DVD cover
- Directed by: Aviva Kempner
- Written by: Aviva Kempner
- Produced by: Aviva Kempner
- Production company: The Ciesla Foundation
- Distributed by: Cowboy Pictures
- Release date: 1998
- Country: United States
- Language: English

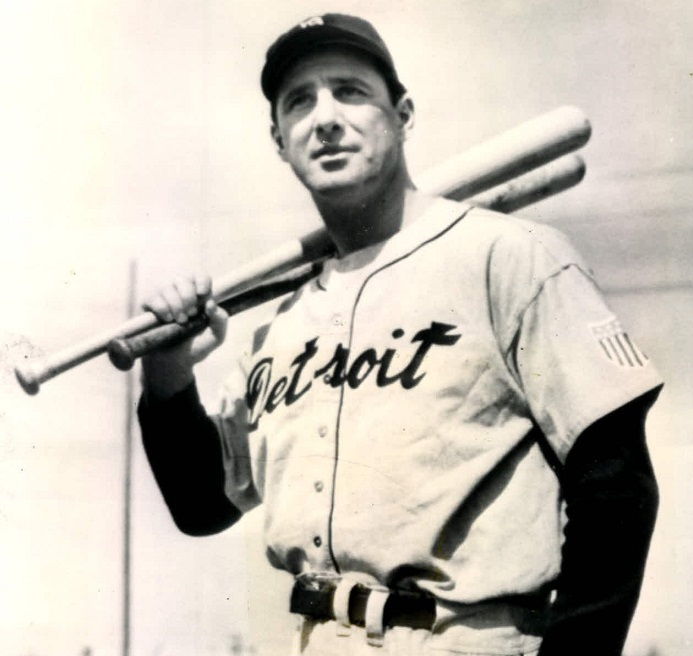
Hank Greenberg

The Life and Times of Hank Greenberg is a 1998 documentary film written, directed, and produced by Aviva Kempner about Hank Greenberg, first baseman of the Detroit Tigers, who was inducted into the Baseball Hall of Fame. A Jewish player who chose not to play on Yom Kippur in 1934 during a heated pennant race, Greenberg had to face a great deal of antisemitism. In 1938 he nearly broke Babe Ruth's 60 home run record by hitting 58 home runs.

Like many players of the era, Greenberg had his career interrupted by military service during World War II. Initially, Greenberg was classified as unfit for service due to flat feet. However, upon re-examination, he was cleared. Before Japan's attack on Pearl Harbor, the United States Congress had released men over age 28. After the attack, Greenberg immediately reenlisted in the United States Army Air Forces.

In 1947, Greenberg, as a member of the Pittsburgh Pirates and playing his final season, was one of the few ballplayers to give a warm welcome to Brooklyn Dodgers' Jackie Robinson, the majors' first black player in many years. Robinson later said, "Class tells. It sticks out all over Mr. Greenberg".

== Production ==
Kempner states that the film took 13 years to make. "It was all about raising money for the rights to the archival and feature footage. That was so expensive that I had to stop and start about 20 times." After its theatrical run, The Life and Times of Hank Greenberg was acquired by Cinemax for its Reel Life series.

== Film credits ==
=== Produced by ===
- Aviva Kempner .... producer
- Ari Daniel Pinchot .... associate producer

=== Directed by ===
- Aviva Kempner

=== Written by ===
- Aviva Kempner

== Cast overview ==
- Reeve Robert Brenner .... Himself – interviewee
- Hank Greenberg .... Himself (archive footage)
- Walter Matthau .... Himself – interviewee
- Alan M. Dershowitz .... Himself – interviewee (as Alan Dershowitz)
- Carl Levin .... Himself – interviewee (as Senator Carl Levin)
- Stephen Greenberg .... Himself – interviewee
- Joseph Greenberg .... Himself – interviewee (as Joe Greenberg)
- Rabbi Max Ticktin .... Himself – interviewee
- Bill Mead .... Himself – interviewee
- Lou Gehrig .... Himself (archive footage)
- Basil 'Mickey' Briggs .... Himself – interviewee
- Don Shapiro .... Himself – interviewee
- Bert Gordon .... Himself – interviewee
- Joe Falls .... Himself – interviewee
- Henry Ford .... Himself (archive footage)
- Fr. Charles Coughlin .... Himself (archive footage)
- Dr. George Barahal .... Himself – interviewee
- Ira Berkow .... Himself – interviewee
- Harold Allen .... Himself – interviewee
- Robert Steinberg .... Himself – interviewee
- Charlie Gehringer .... Himself – interviewee (also archive footage)
- Herman 'Flea' Clifton .... Himself – interviewee
- Billy Rogell .... Himself – interviewee
- Birdie Tebbetts .... Himself – interviewee (as George 'Birdie' Tebbetts)
- Ernie Harwell .... Himself – interviewee
- Elden Auker .... Himself – interviewee (as Eldon Auker)
- Dick Schaap .... Himself – interviewee
- Goose Goslin .... Himself (archive footage)
- Dizzy Dean .... Himself (archive footage)
- Harvey Frank .... Himself – interviewee
- Marilyn Greenberg .... Herself – interviewee
- Harriet Colman .... Herself – interviewee
- Alva Greenberg .... Herself – interviewee
- Mickey Cochrane .... Himself – interviewee
- Charlie Grimm .... Himself – interviewee (archive footage)
- Michael Moriarty .... Himself – interviewee
- Max Lapides .... Himself – interviewee
- Gabby Hartnett .... Himself (archive footage)
- Joe Louis .... Himself (archive footage)
- Shirley Povich .... Himself – interviewee
- Al Rosen .... Himself (archive footage)
- Rip Collins .... Himself – interviewee
- Tommy Bridges .... Himself (archive footage)
- Joe DiMaggio .... Himself (archive footage)
- Jane Briggs Hart .... Herself – interviewee
- Harry Eisenstat .... Himself – interviewee
- Bob Feller .... Himself – interviewee (also archive footage)
- Hoot Robinson .... Himself – interviewee
- Rudy York .... Himself (archive footage)
- Hal Newhouser .... Himself – interviewee
- Barney McCosky .... Himself – interviewee
- Bobo Newsom .... Himself (archive footage) (as 'Buck' Newsom)
- Paul Derringer .... Himself (archive footage)
- Junior Thompson .... Himself (archive footage)
- Bucky Walters .... Himself (archive footage)
- Franklin Delano Roosevelt .... Himself (also radio broadcast) (archive footage)
- Del Baker .... Himself – interviewee
- Arn Tellem .... Himself – interviewee
- Barney Ross .... Himself (archive footage)
- Caral Gimbel .... Herself – interviewee
- Glenn Greenberg .... Himself – interviewee
- Sander Levin .... Himself – interviewee (as Congressman Sander Levin)
- Walter Briggs, Jr. .... Himself (archive footage) (as Walter 'Spike' Briggs, Jr.)
- Walter Briggs, Sr. .... Himself (archive footage)
- Happy Chandler .... Himself (archive footage)
- Bill Shuster .... Himself (archive footage)
- Steve O'Neill .... Himself (archive footage)
- Paul Richards .... Himself (archive footage)
- Virgil Trucks .... Himself – interviewee
- George Kell .... Himself – interviewee
- Billy Herman .... Himself (archive footage) (as Billy Hermann)
- Jackie Robinson .... Himself (archive footage)
- Kenesaw M. Landis .... Himself (archive footage) (uncredited)
- Connie Mack .... Himself (archive footage) (uncredited)
- Maury Povich .... Himself – interviewee (uncredited)
- Babe Ruth .... Himself (archive footage) (uncredited)

== Awards ==
- 2001 Broadcast Film Critics Association Awards – "Best Feature Documentary"
- 2001 Chicago Film Critics Association Awards – "Best Documentary" (tied with The Filth and the Fury (2000))
- 2001 Columbus International Film & Video Festival – "Silver Chris Award – Religion"
- 2001 Florida Film Critics Circle Awards – "Best Documentary"
- 1998 Hamptons International Film Festival – "Audience Award for Most Popular Documentary (Aviva Kempner) tied with Red, White & Yellow (1998)"
- 2001 Kansas City Film Critics Circle Awards – "Best Documentary"
- 2000 Las Vegas Film Critics Society Awards – "Sierra Award for Best Documentary"
- 2000 National Board of Review, USA – "Best Documentary"
- 2001 National Society of Film Critics Awards, USA – "Best Documentary"
- 2000 New York Film Critics Circle Awards – "Best Non-Fiction Film"
- 2001 Peabody Award
- 1999 Washington Jewish Film Festival – "Audience Award for Documentary (Aviva Kempner)"

== Reception ==
On Rotten Tomatoes, the film has an aggregate score of 97% based on 66 positive reviews. The website's consensus reads: "The Life and Times of Hank Greenberg is an affectionate, often very funny portrait of a baseball pioneer."

== See also ==
- Jews and Baseball: An American Love Story, 2010 documentary film
- List of baseball films
