= Carobeth Laird =

American ethnologist (1895–1983)

- Born: Carobeth Tucker; July 20, 1895; Coleman, Texas
- Died: August 5, 1983 (aged 88); Poway, California
- Occupations: Writer, ethnologist
- Spouses: John P. Harrington; George Laird
- Children: 7

Carobeth Laird (née Tucker; formerly Harrington; July 20, 1895 – August 5, 1983) was an American ethnographer and linguist, known for her memoirs and ethnographic studies of the Chemehuevi people in southeastern California and western Arizona. Her book, The Chemehuevis, was characterized by ethnographer Lowell John Bean as "one of the finest, most detailed ethnographies ever written." Her memoirs, Encounter with an Angry God and Limbo, chronicled her first marriage to linguistic anthropologist John P. Harrington and her time in a nursing home, respectively.

== Early life and education ==
Carobeth Tucker was born in Coleman, Texas. She discovered her facility for languages during a trip to Mexico during the summer of 1909. After giving birth to her first daughter, Elisabeth, at age seventeen, in 1915, she enrolled in the San Diego Normal School, where she took a course in linguistics that was taught by John P. Harrington, an extremely productive and eccentric linguist and ethnographer. Harrington was impressed by Tucker's facility with languages, and they were married in the following year. They had one daughter, Awona.

== Career ==
Tucker assisted Harrington in his field work for the Bureau of American Ethnology and learned ethnographic skills from him. For seven years, she traveled with Harrington through California and the Southwest and helped compile a huge amount of ethnographic notes. In 1919, Harrington sent her to Parker, Arizona, to work among the Chemehuevi people. While there, Tucker's principal consultant was a Chemehuevi man, George Laird, who lived on the Colorado River Indian Reservation. George Laird was fluent in Chemehuevi, Spanish, Mojave, and English, and had participated in and witnessed old tribal ceremonies. After she divorced Harrington in 1922, Tucker and Laird married and had five children. One of their children, Georgia Laird Culp, was active in receiving federal recognition for the Chemehuevi people.

After they married, the Lairds continued their work in documenting the mythology and tribal history of the Chemehuevi. After George Laird's death in 1940, Carobeth Laird was destitute and worked as a practitioner for the Christian Science Church until 1960 to support her family.

Laird attempted to publish her manuscript on the Chemehuevi, but she was discouraged by an anthropology professor at the University of California, Los Angeles, who described her work as "old-fashioned anthropology." She continued to write for the Chemehuevi newsletter and, with her daughter Georgia Laird Culp, conducted research for the Chemehuevi association.

Laird's work did not achieve scholarly attention until the early 1970s, when she shared her manuscript with Lowell Bean and his students. Bean arranged for its publication with Malki Museum in 1976 as The Chemehuevis. While this book contract was being negotiated, Laird was encouraged to write an autobiography about her time doing field work with Harrington. This account, Encounter with an Angry God, was published in 1975. It related many of the harsh realities of field work, as well as the breakup of her marriage with Harrington.

Laird's work combined ethnography and mythology. She believed that songs and myths were the principal ways that the Chemehuevi transmitted their tribal memories and social mores. She also commented on the perceived equal status of women among the Chemehuevi, in that women never occupied a position of inferiority, their voices were heard equally at gatherings, and male and female shamans were given the same level of respect.

In 1974, due to her declining health, Laird sought care in a nursing home. Concerned about the treatment of the elderly that she experienced first-hand, she wrote Limbo, a memoir describing her experience. The book has subsequently been used as a reference in medical schools and nursing programs as a way to help medical students understand the perspective of their patients.

Laird's last book, Mirror and Pattern, a linguistic and structural analysis of Chemehuevi myths and language, was published posthumously in 1984. Laird's ethnographic studies were also published as several articles in Journal of California Anthropology.

Laird's letters and manuscripts are on file at the University of California, Riverside.

== Bibliography ==
- Laird, Carobeth. 1975. Encounter with an Angry God: Recollections of My Life with John Peabody Harrington. Malki Museum Press, Banning, California. ISBN 978-0-8263-1414-7
- Laird, Carobeth. 1976. The Chemehuevis. Malki Museum Press, Banning, California.
- Laird, Carobeth. 1979. Limbo. Chandler & Sharp, Novato, California. ISBN 978-0-88316-536-2
- Laird, Carobeth. 1984. Mirror and Pattern: George Laird's World of Chemehuevi Mythology. Malki Museum Press, Banning, California.
