= Havasu Lake, California =

Community in San Bernardino County

Coordinates: 34.483°N 114.410°W

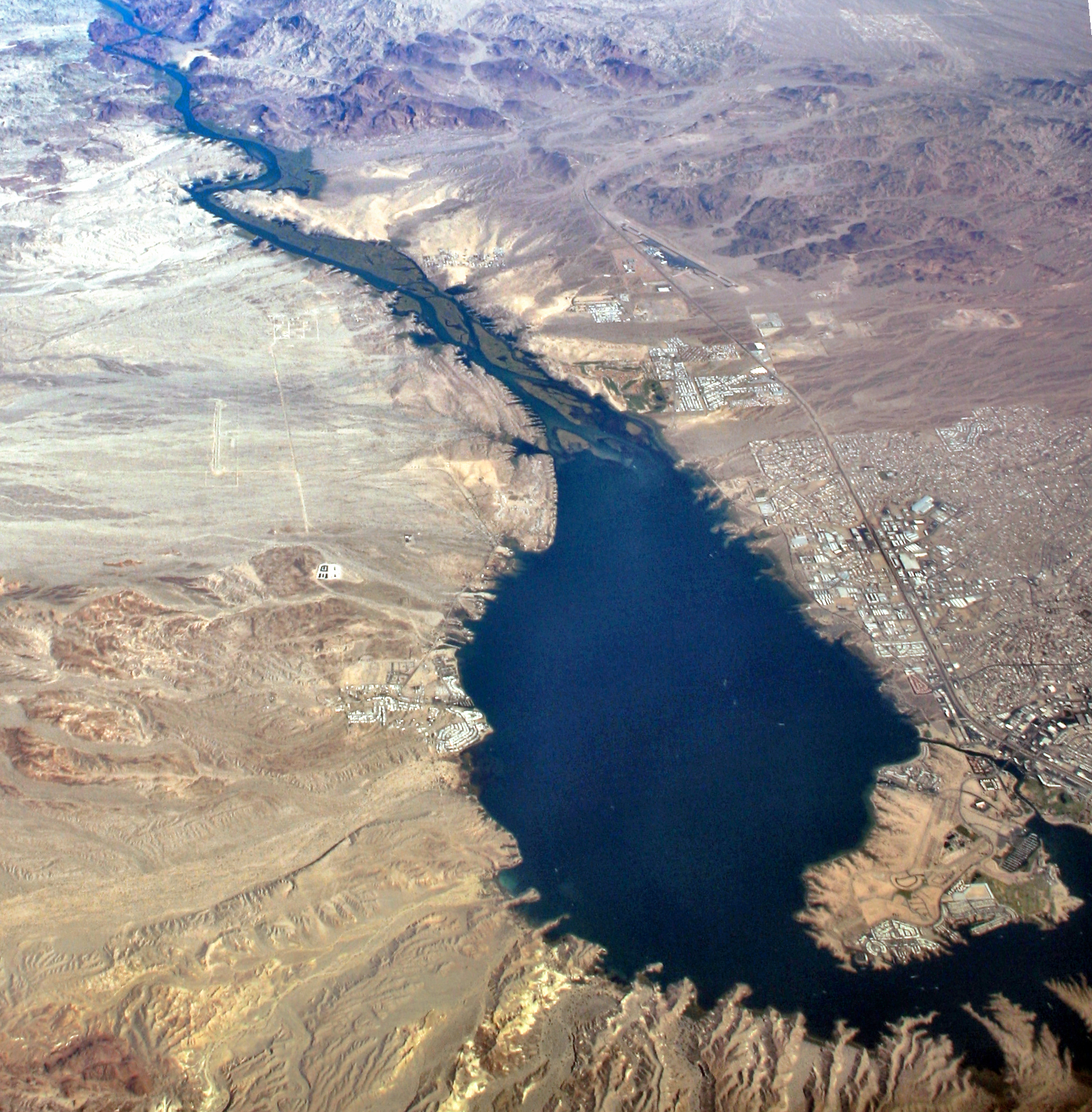
Lake Havasu with Lake Havasu City, Arizona on the east shore and Havasu Lake, California on the western shore.

Havasu Lake is an unincorporated community in San Bernardino County, California, United States, located on Lake Havasu on the Chemehuevi Reservation in the Mojave Desert. The community serves as the seat of the tribal government of the Chemehuevi Indian Tribe and is home to the Havasu Landing Casino.

The Siwavaats Junior College in Havasu Lake teaches the Chemehuevi language.

Water is provided by the Havasu Water Company. Sanitation Services are provided by San Bernardino County Service area HL 70 Havasu Lake

Students in Havasu Lake attend schools within the Needles Unified School District. Elementary School Students attend Chemehuevi Valley Elementary School

Havasu Landing Resort and Casino provides a ferry from Havasu Lake to Lake Havasu City, Arizona.
