= Évocateur: The Morton Downey Jr. Movie =

- Directed by: Seth Kramer; Daniel A. Miller; Jeremy Newberger
- Music by: Peter Rundquist
- Production company: Ironbound Films
- Distributed by: Magnolia Pictures
- Release dates: 21 April 2012 (Tribeca); 7 June 2013
- Country: United States
- Language: English
- Box office: $21,652

Évocateur: The Morton Downey Jr. Movie is a 2012 documentary film that chronicles the history of The Morton Downey Jr. Show and Downey's influence on "trash TV."

== Synopsis ==
Évocateur features interviews with Chris Elliott, Gloria Allred, Sally Jessy Raphael, Alan Dershowitz, Curtis Sliwa, and Richard Bey, among others. Previously unreleased footage reveals Downey's behind-the-scenes fistfights and foibles. The film also looks at Downey's relationship with Al Sharpton and other important 1980s figures.

Évocateur also features an interview with Steven Pagones, the white assistant district attorney who was falsely accused of raping black teenager Tawana Brawley in 1988. Pagones discusses how the case and the related TV debates between Downey and Sharpton affected his life.

== Production ==
On July 10, 2015, CNN announced that it had acquired the broadcast rights to the film, and that the network would air it for the first time on August 13. On July 31, the premiere date was pushed back to August 20.
