= Humanoid (disambiguation) =

A humanoid is any non-human entity that resembles a human.

Humanoid(s) may also refer to:

- Humanoid robot, a robot resembling the human body in shape

== Music ==
- Humanoid (musician), Brian Dougans (born 1965), Scottish musician and composer
- Humanoid (Accept album), 2024
- Humanoid (Tokio Hotel album), 2009
- Humanoids (album), a repackaged version of Catch Me, by TVXQ, 2012
- "Humanoid", a song by Chevelle from Vena Sera, 2007

== Other uses ==
- The Humanoid (film), a 1979 Italian science fiction film
- The Humanoids, a 1949 novel by Jack Williamson
- Humanoids Publishing, or Les Humanoïdes Associés, a comic book publisher

== See also ==
- Anthropoid (disambiguation)
- Hominidae, a family of apes
