= Museum of Archaeology and Anthropology =

Museum of Archaeology and Anthropology may refer to a number of museums, including:

- Museo Nacional de Antropología, Mexico City, Mexico
- Museo Nacional de Arqueología, Antropología e Historia del Perú, Lima, Peru
- Museum of Archaeology and Anthropology, University of Cambridge, England
- University of Pennsylvania Museum of Archaeology and Anthropology, Philadelphia, United States

== See also ==
- National Museum of Anthropology (disambiguation)
