= Cottonwood Island (Nevada) =

Island in the Colorado River

- Location within Nevada

Geography
- Location: Colorado River
- Coordinates: 35°25′08″N 114°38′13″W
- Length: 10 mi (20 km)
- Width: 3 mi (5 km)

Administration
- USA
- State: Nevada
- County: Clark County

Demographics
- Population: 0 (1869)

Cottonwood Island, a large island in the Colorado River, within Cottonwood Valley, in Clark County, Nevada. Cottonwood Island was a low-lying island about 10 miles long and up to 3 miles wide. It was forested by cottonwoods and also after the spring flood, cluttered with driftwood from the riparian woodlands along the upper watershed of the Colorado River, washed down and caught in the first wide valley where the river slowed and spread out. Cottonwood Island was important as a source wood and of fuel for steamboats on that river and for the early mills and mines in El Dorado Canyon.

John Ross Browne described it in his 1869 report on the Colorado River:

"Cottonwood island, about 10 miles long by an average of about three miles wide, is a fine, level island, fertile and covered with grass, and having considerable timber. Claims are said to have been located upon the land, but it is yet unoccupied. On the main land on both sides of the river opposite Cottonwood island are fine bottom lands, with good grass."

"A large quantity of driftwood of superior kind for fuel, composed mainly of pitch-pine and cedar, every year lodges at the head and along the sides of the island — sufficient, perhaps, alone, if taken care of, to furnish the fuel for years to steamboats passing on the Callville route. An immense quantity of this wood was upon the island, estimated at several thousand cords. The entire head of the island seemed to be formed of trunks of trees and sand washed in between them. The driftwood consists of trees, much broken up, of various sizes, not usually exceeding 14 inches in diameter."

Cottonwood Island appears in the 1875 Topographical Sketch showing the Outward and Inward Route of a Party, while examining as to the practicability of a Diversion of the Colorado River for Purposes of Irrigation, from an annual report by 1st Lt. G. M. Wheeler, Corps Of Engineers. Cottonwood Island later appears on a September 1911 reprint of a U. S. Geological Survey, Reconnaissance Map, Arizona, Nevada, California, Camp Mohave Sheet, Edition of March 1892, reprinted.

== History ==
Cottonwood Island was a site favored by the Mohave people for their agriculture, dependent as it was on the spring flood for its irrigation, and for the products they made from the cottonwood trees. It was an object of dispute with the ChemehueviPaiute to the north and west, in the later 19th Century.

All the driftwood deposited on the island became an item of trade following the establishment of mines in El Dorado Canyon in 1861. Wood was cut up by the Mohave and provided as fuel to steamboats traveling the river past Cottonwood Island or as timber for the mines. But such traffic only could occur during the high water months, the only time the steamboats would navigate the rapids and shallows of this upper reach of the Colorado. In late 1863 when the first stamp mill was established at the mines, ore was no longer carried down river in sufficient volume and the steamboats did not come as often. Additionally the need for more regular supplies of goods from down river at Hardyville, where the steamboats stopped at low water, and the need for more regular and large supplies for wood and wood fuel for the mills brought Captain L. C. Wilburn and a fleet of 3 barges, the Colorado, El Dorado and Veagas. These barges were sailed and poled up and down river by Paiute and Mohave crews during the slack months. They carried hay, timber, wood and charcoal made on the island up river to the mills in three or four days. They also ascended the Colorado River as far as the Virgin River to bring back salt to the mills, for refining the ore, mined in the Virgin Valley by Mormon colonists there.

== Present status ==
Cottonwood Island was permanently submerged beneath the waters of Lake Mohave, and no longer exists as a distinct geographical feature.
