= Anthropod =

Anthropod may refer to:

- Anthropod, a podcast published by the Society for Cultural Anthropology
- "Anthropod", a track on the experimental rock music album Experiment Below, by Hovercraft
- "Anthropod", a track on the electro-industrial music album WarMech by Front Line Assembly
- Anthropods, a race of alien creatures in the computer game X-COM: Apocalypse
- Anthropods, a single by Talons (band)

== See also ==
- Anthropoid (disambiguation)
- Arthropod, animals of the phylum Arthropoda, including insects, arachnids, myriapods and crustaceans
