= Rudolf Jettmar =

Austrian painter and printmaker

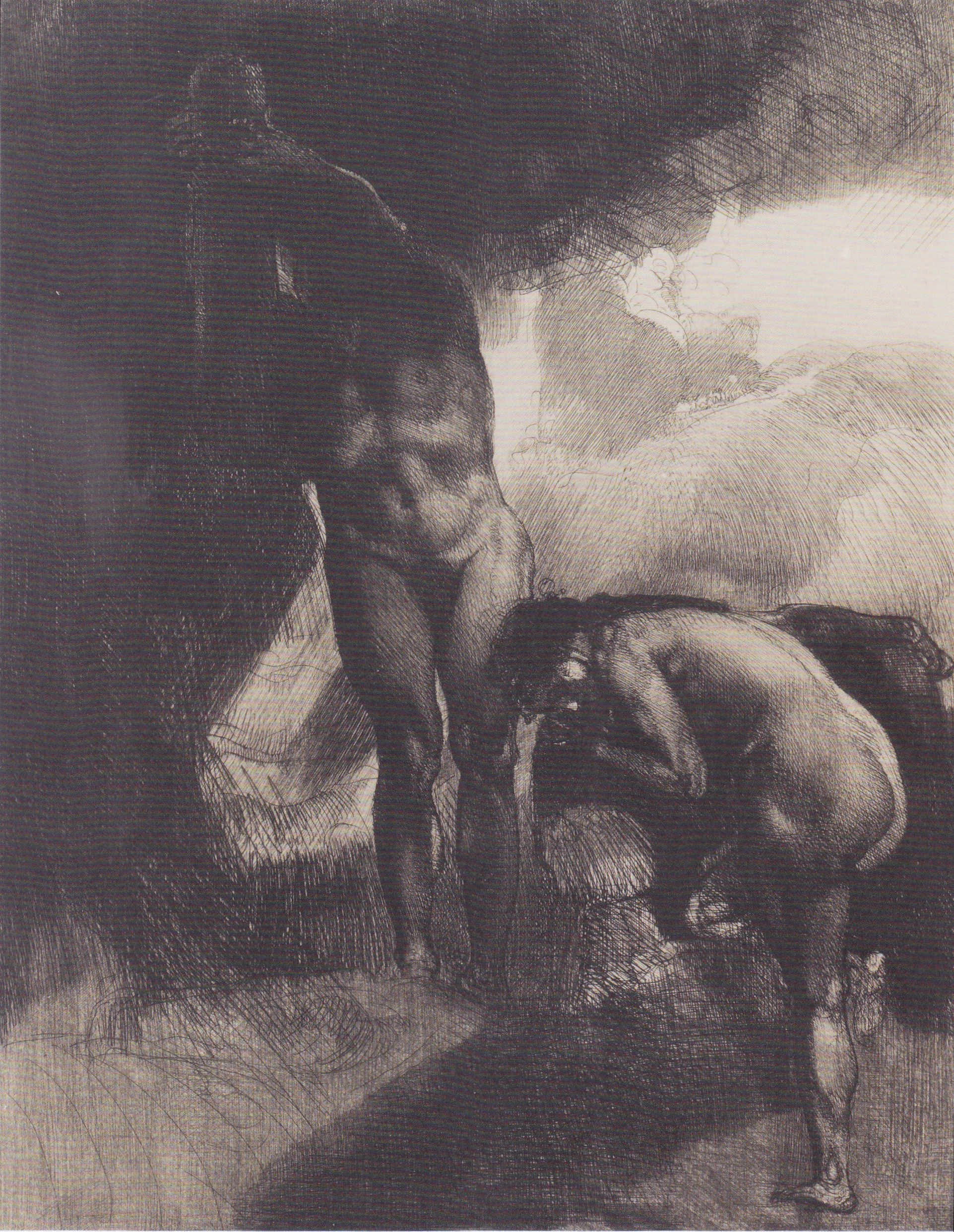
Building the Bridge from Hell to Earth, illustration for Paradise Lost, 1899. Etching on paper, 36.9 x 28 cm.

Rudolf Jettmar (10 September 1869, Tarnów — 21 April 1939, Vienna) was an Austrian painter and printmaker.

The largest collection of the work of Rudolf Jettmar in the United States is held by the Jack Daulton Collection in Los Altos Hills, California.
