= Rosenwald Court Apartments =

Apartment building in Chicago, Illinois

- U.S. National Register of Historic Places
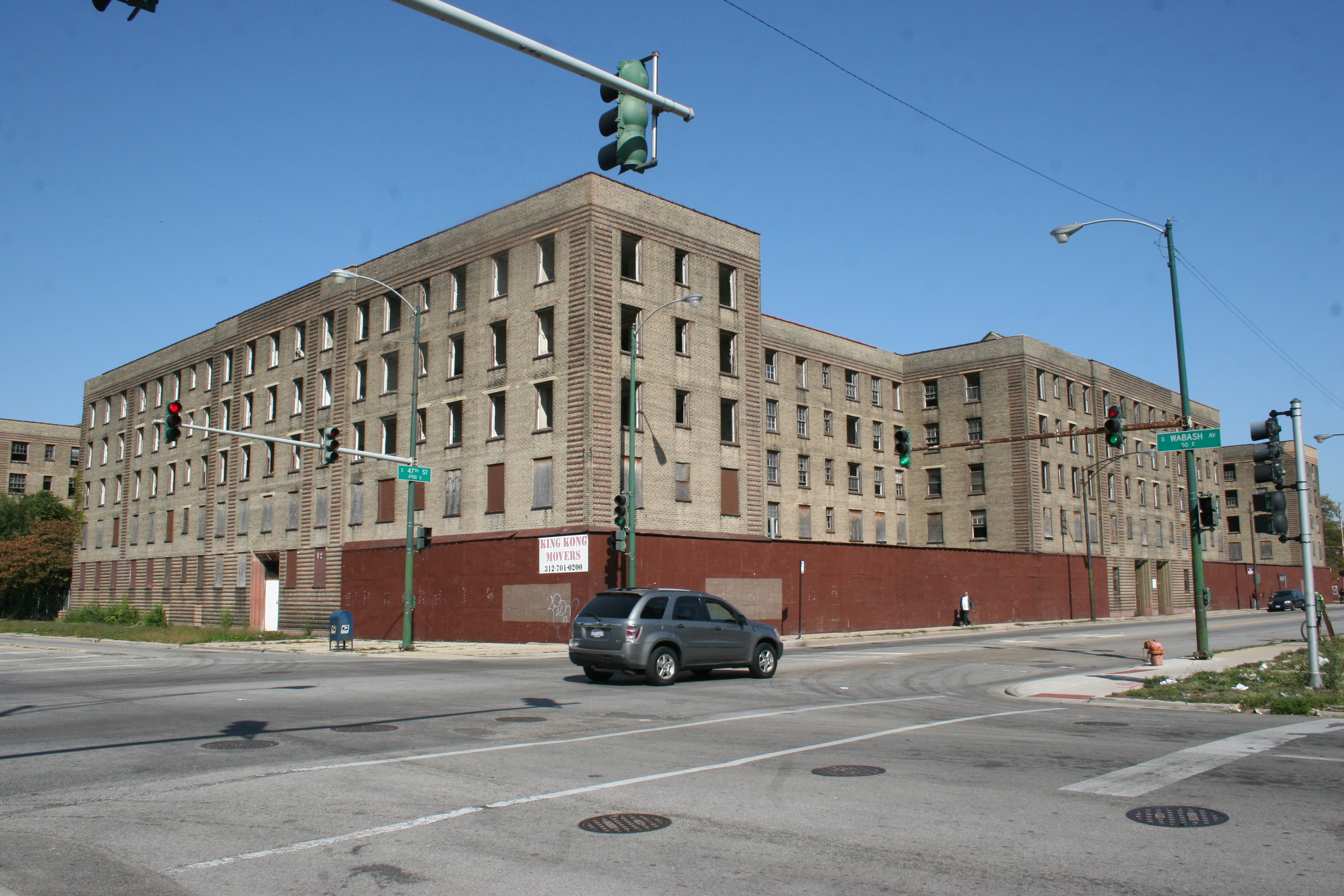
- A 2012 photograph viewed from 47th Street and Wabash Avenue

- Location within Chicago metropolitan area Location within Illinois Location within the United States
- Location: 47th Street and Michigan Avenue, Chicago, Illinois
- Coordinates: 41°48′36″N 87°37′25″W
- Area: 4 acres (1.6 ha)
- Built: 1929
- NRHP reference No.: 81000218
- Added to NRHP: August 13, 1981

Michigan Boulevard Garden Apartments
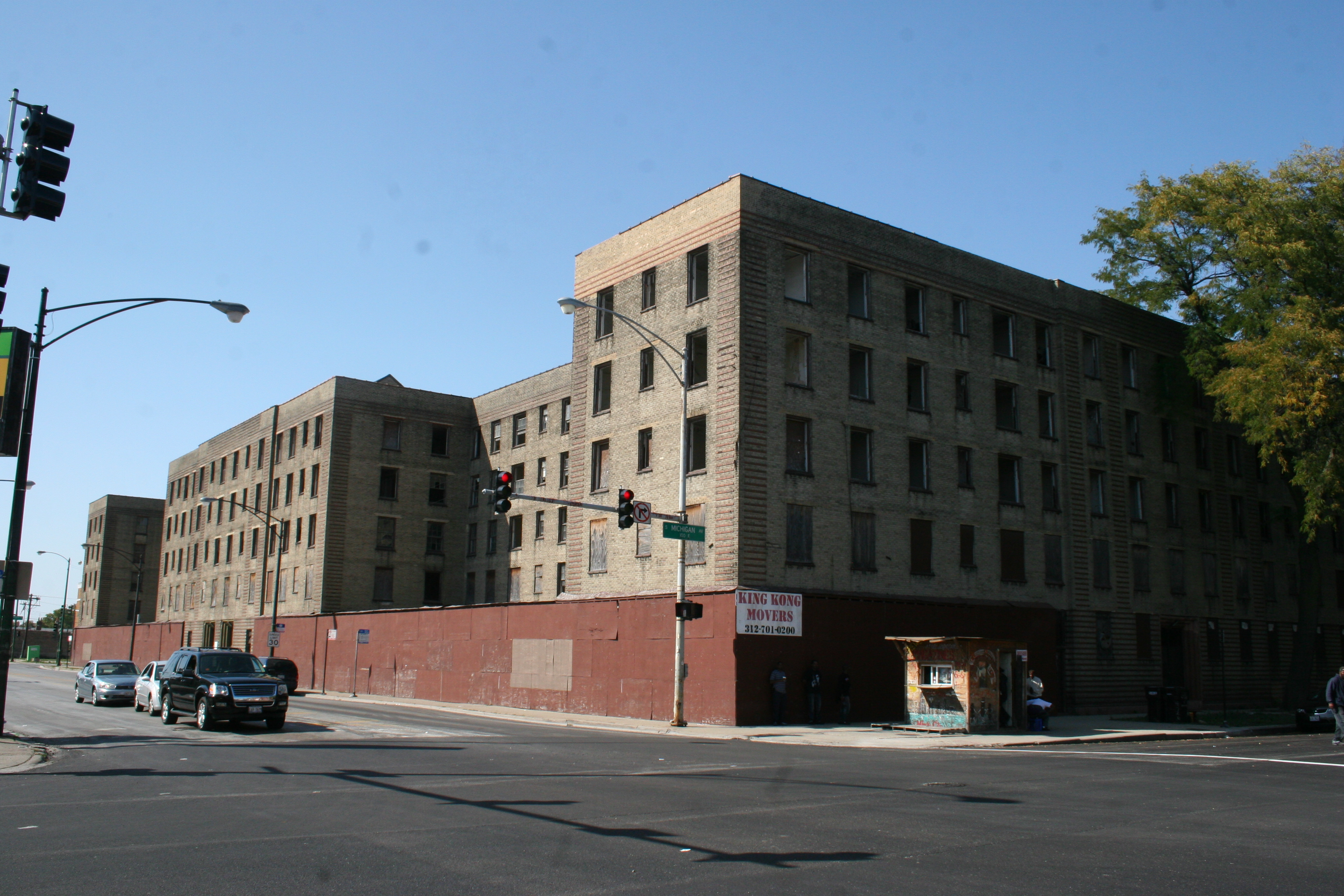
- A 2012 photograph viewed from 47th Street and Michigan Avenue
- Interactive map of Michigan Boulevard Garden Apartments

General information
- Location: Bounded by 46th and 47th Street and Michigan and Wabash Avenues; Chicago, Illinois, United States
- Status: Occupied

Construction
- Constructed: 1929-1930; renovated 2015-2016

Other information
- Famous residents: Gwendolyn Brooks; Nat King Cole; Joe Louis; Quincy Jones

Rosenwald Court Apartments (also known as Rosenwald Courts or the Rosenwald Apartments; formerly known as Michigan Boulevard Garden Apartments) is a large apartment building located in the Bronzeville neighborhood of the South Side of Chicago, Illinois. It is located at East 47th Street and South Michigan Avenue, just one block east of the former Chicago Housing Authority's Robert Taylor Homes site. In total, the building is made up of 421 apartments, a large landscaped courtyard, and retail space at street level. It was originally built as non-governmental subsidized housing and is considered to be among the earliest mixed-use housing developments.

== History ==
The building was constructed in 1929 by philanthropist Julius Rosenwald, then president of Sears, Roebuck & Company. The housing project was modeled after the Dunbar Apartments in Harlem, New York City, built by John D. Rockefeller Jr. in 1926.

In 1981, the Rosenwald Apartment Building received National Register of Historic Places designation.

The last residents moved out in 2000, after mismanagement and lack of upkeep made the site uninhabitable.

In 2010, filming for the 2011 film Transformers: Dark of the Moon was done on site. In the movie, the apartments doubled as part of the Chernobyl nuclear plant in Ukraine.

In 2015, a complete renovation of the building and courtyard, which had been added to the National Register of Historic Places, began. The intention was to create a mixture of senior citizen apartments and affordable housing for families.

The rebuilding and landscaping was completed in 2016, and the site reopened to the public as Rosenwald Courts.

== See also ==
- Rosenwald (film)
