= Aviva Kempner =

American filmmaker (born 1946)

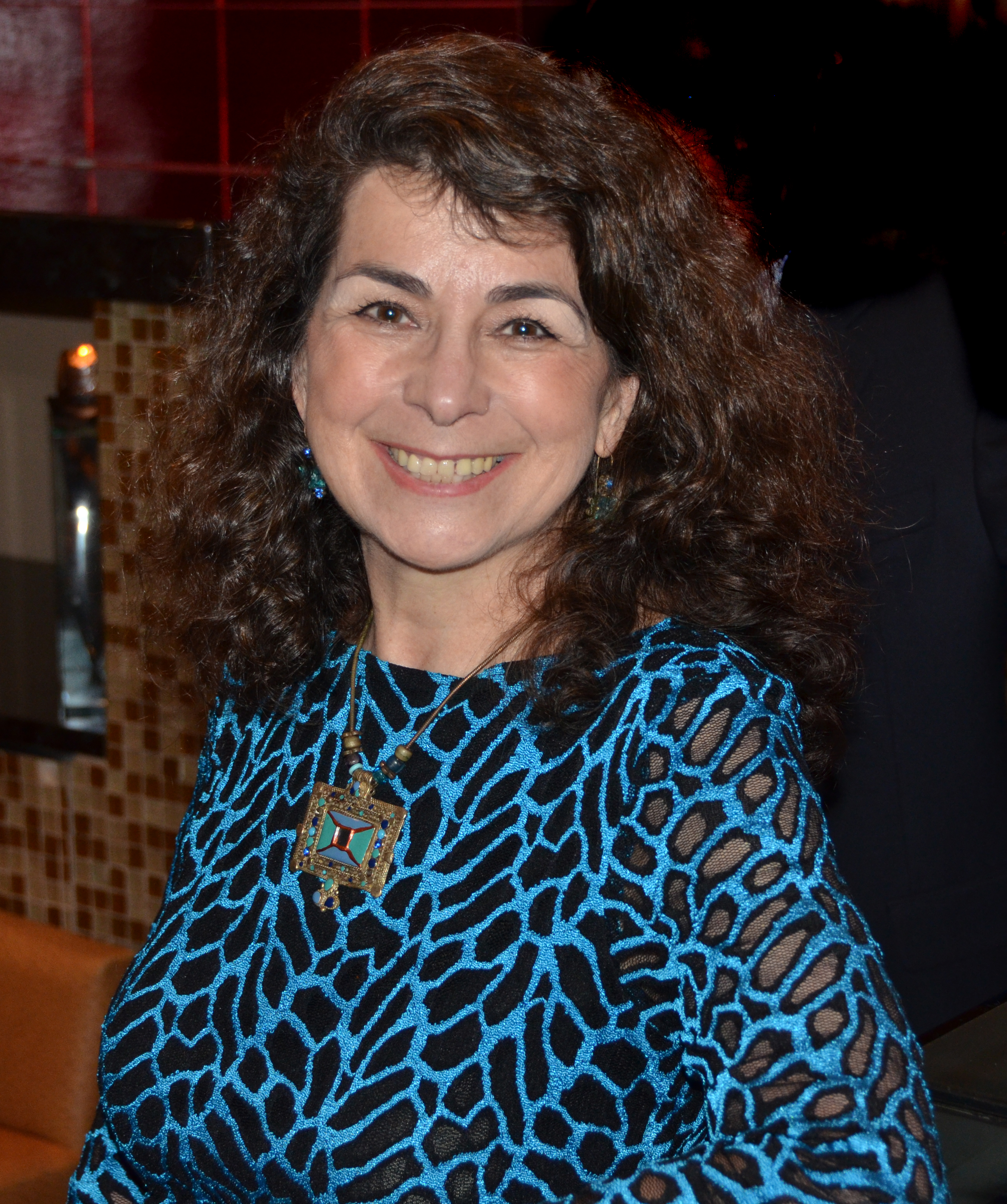
- Kempner in 2011
- Born: December 23, 1946 (age 79); Berlin, Germany
- Education: University of Michigan

Aviva Kempner (born December 23, 1946) is a German-born American filmmaker. Her documentaries investigate non-stereotypical images of Jews in history and focus on the untold stories of Jewish people. She is most well known for The Life and Times of Hank Greenberg.

== Life and career ==
A child of Holocaust survivor Helen Ciesla, a Polish citizen, and Harold Kempner, a US Army officer, Kempner was born in Berlin, Germany, after World War II. Her family history inspired her to create her first documentary, Partisans of Vilna (1986). She grew up in Detroit and has a brother, Jonathan. Kempner lives in Washington, DC and is an activist for voting rights for the District of Columbia.

She was a member of the Class of 1976 at the progressive Antioch School of Law. In 1981, Kempner founded The Ciesla Foundation to produce films that investigate non-stereotypical images of Jews in history and celebrate the untold stories of Jewish heroes. In 1986, Kempner conceived and produced Partisans of Vilna, a documentary on Jewish resistance against the Nazis, Fareynikte Partizaner Organizatsye. She co-founded the Washington Jewish Film Festival in 1989 together with Miriam Mörsel Nathan, and served as the festival's Founding Director.

Additionally, she was the executive producer of the 1989 Grammy Award-nominated record Partisans of Vilna: The Songs of World War II Jewish Resistance.

She is the scriptwriter, director and producer of The Life and Times of Hank Greenberg, a film about first Jewish baseball star in the Major Leagues.

In 2009, she produced Yoo-Hoo, Mrs. Goldberg, a 90-minute documentary about Gertrude Berg, a popular American radio and television personalities who received the first Best Actress Emmy in history and paved the way for women in media and entertainment. Berg was the creator, principal writer, and star of the popular 1930s radio show and then the 1950s weekly televised situation comedy, The Goldbergs.

Kempner made Rosenwald (2015), a feature-length historical documentary about businessman and philanthropist Julius Rosenwald, who partnered with Booker T. Washington and African American communities to build over 5,000 schools in the Jim Crow South. The Rosenwald Fund also provided grants to support a who's who of African American artists and intellectuals.

She is also the co-writer and co-producer of Casuse, a film about Larry Casuse, a young Native American activist who kidnapped the Mayor of Gallup, New Mexico to draw attention to the plight of the Navajo people and to expose the hypocrisy of the establishment.

Kempner directed, wrote and produced The Spy Behind Home Plate, the first full-length documentary about Moe Berg, a Jewish baseball player, who caught and fielded in the Major Leagues from the 1920s through 1939 during baseball's Golden Age and his activities with the US Office of Strategic Services (OSS). When asked about lessons she hoped viewers would take away from the film in a 2019 interview with Sporting News, Kempner said:

I think we need to know our history of how at a time when the world was in peril, and how a sports hero, someone in baseball, wound up being a real American hero. You know for me also, having done a Hank Greenberg film but also knowing about Ted Williams and Joe Dimaggio going off to war, their stats are not what they would have been if they hadn't sacrificed for their country. Moe would have probably ended up being a manager afterward. They not only sacrificed their lives, but also their sports standing.

She writes film criticism and feature articles for numerous publications, including The Boston Globe, Chicago Tribune, Crystal City Magazine, The Forward, Baltimore Jewish Times, Jewish Telegraphic Agency, Legal Times, New York Times, The Wrap, Washington Jewish Week and The Washington Post.

Kempner said in a 2009 interview with FF2 Media's Jan Lisa Huttner: "In The Life and Times of Hank Greenberg, we use this line: 'When America needed a hero, a Jewish slugger stepped to the plate.' I think you can also say: 'When America needed a hero, a Jewish mother was there for you.'"

Kempner is currently co-producing and co-directing Imagining the Indian: The Fight Against Native American Mascoting, a full length documentary exploring the history of using Native American images in mascoting and the fight to change the name of current professional sports teams.

Kempner is also producing and directing a short film, Pissed Off, exploring the under-publicized struggles faced by female lawmakers in Congress who advocated for equal access to restroom facilities in their place of work, the United States Capitol, and a full length documentary on Academy Award winning Hollywood screenwriter, Ben Hecht. Ben Hecht was a Jewish screenwriter as well as novelist, playwright, journalist, and activist. He worked to rescue European Jewry and helped to expose the nature of the Holocaust and the need for a Jewish homeland to the American public.

== Awards and accolades ==
- Member of the Academy of Motion Picture Arts and Sciences
- 1996 Guggenheim Fellowship
- 2000 DC Mayor's Art Award
- 2001 Women of Vision Award, D.C.’s Women in Film and Video chapter
- 2001 Media Arts Award, The National Foundation for Jewish Culture
- 2009 San Francisco Jewish Film Festival's Freedom of Expression Awardee
- 2017 Bernardo O'Higgins Award
- 2018 Honorary Doctorate of Humane Letters from the University of the District of Columbia

== Publications ==
=== Filmography (director/producer) ===
- Partisans of Vilna (1986) (producer only)
- The Life and Times of Hank Greenberg (1999), awarded the Audience Awards at the Hamptons International Film Festival and Washington Jewish Film Festival; Spirit Award for Best Sports Documentary, International Sports Video and Film Awards; top honors from the National Society of Film Critics, the National Board of Review, the New York Film Critics Circle and Broadcast Film Critics Association; CINE Golden Eagle and George Peabody Award.
- Today I Vote for My Joey (2002)
- Yoo-Hoo, Mrs. Goldberg (2009), winner of CINE Golden Eagle and festival audience awards; Women's Film Critics Circle posthumous Lifetime Achievement Award winner for Gertrude Berg.
- Rosenwald (2015)
- Casuse (work in progress)
- The Spy Behind Home Plate (2019)
- Imagining the Indian: The Fight Against Native American Mascoting (2023)
- A Pocketful of Miracles: A Tale of Two Siblings (2023)

== In Remembrance Culture of Europe ==
Remembering Reichspogromnach. America Haus Nordrhein Westfalen. Screening and Discussion of "A Pocketful of Miracles: A Tale of Two Siblings" (2023) by Aviva Kempner. Virtual discussion after the screening with Aviva Kempner, Director of "A Pocketful of Miracles - A Tale of Two Siblings".Tuesday, November 10, 2026.TURISTARAMA cinema theater, Mauritiussteinweg 102, 50676 Köln, Nordrhein Westfalen, FRG

== Book chapters ==
- God, Faith and Identity in the Ashes: Perspectives of Children and Grandchildren of Holocaust Survivors
- Hammerin’ Hank Greenberg: Call Him the Hero of Heroes
- When You Need A Little Lift: But Don't Want To Eat Chocolate, Pay a Shrink, or Drink a Bottle of Gin
- Jews and American Popular Culture
- What Israel Means to Me
- Daughters of Absence
