= Heading Home =

2018 film

Heading Home: The Tale of Team Israel
- Directed by: Seth Kramer; Daniel A. Miller; Jeremy Newberger
- Written by: Daniel A. Miller
- Produced by: Jonathan Mayo; Seth Kramer; Daniel A. Miller; Jeremy Newberger
- Starring: Ike Davis; Cody Decker; Sam Fuld; Ty Kelly; Ryan Lavarnway; Jerry Weinstein; Josh Zeid
- Edited by: Seth Kramer
- Music by: Peter Rundquist; Niv Toar
- Production company: Ironbound Films
- Release date: August 5, 2018
- Running time: 87 minutes
- Countries: United States; Israel; Japan; South Korea
- Language: English
- Box office: $207,533

Heading Home: The Tale of Team Israel is a 2018 documentary film about the underdog Israel national baseball team competing for the first time in the World Baseball Classic. The 87-minute film was directed by Seth Kramer, Daniel A. Miller, and Jeremy Newberger, the three of whom produced it along with Jonathan Mayo, and starred baseball player Ike Davis and other baseball players.

== Plot ==
Heading Home follows Team Israel’s surprising success in the World Baseball Classic in March 2017. Every player on the team was either an Israeli or a Jewish American eligible for Israeli citizenship under Israel's Law of Return. Ryan Lavarnway, the Team Israel catcher, referring to the Nazi “mischling” law that defined a Jew by even one grandparent mused: “Two generations ago, the way this team was put together would have meant that we were being rounded up to be killed… For us to be able to stand up here and have the Israel flag and Jewish star hanging in the stadium, it [means] we’re here.”

The documentary follows the team winning the qualifier, practicing before hundreds of local baseball players in Israel, seeing Israeli sites such as the Western Wall, Yad Vashem, the Dead Sea, and Masada, and taking part in a groundbreaking ceremony for a new baseball field in Bet Shemesh, Israel. It then chronicles the team's performance at the 2017 World Baseball Classic in South Korea and Japan—as they sweep the first round, and play well into the second round.

The odds against Israel were 200-1, and it was ranked 41st in the world - while the other teams were primarily the top 15 ranked teams in the world. ESPN compared Team Israel to the Jamaican bobsled team. Israel beat top-ranked teams from Cuba, South Korea, China, Taiwan, and the Netherlands, all ranked in the top 10 in the world, and came in 6th in the tournament.

== Cast ==
- Ike Davis as himself
- Cody Decker as himself
- Sam Fuld as himself
- Ty Kelly as himself
- Ryan Lavarnway as himself
- Jerry Weinstein as himself
- Josh Zeid as himself

== Production ==
The movie was the idea of MLB.com reporter Jonathan Mayo, who initially wanted to create a movie that reflected both his affection for baseball and his Jewish background by creating a documentary about Jewish major leaguers traveling to discover their roots, and ended up with a documentary that was about the team's "Cinderella Story" run in the World Baseball Classic.

Mayo and three friends of his from Jewish summer camp (Camp Young Judaea Sprout Lake) -- Daniel Miller, Jeremy Newberger, and Seth Kramer, of Ironbound Films—were the producers. The producers raised $73,000 through Kickstarter.

== Release ==
Heading Home was first released in the United States on August 5, 2018.

== Critical response ==
The Atlanta Jewish Times in its review opined that the documentary "is just as inspirational and exciting as Team Israel's run in the World Baseball Classic." The Israeli newspaper Haaretz said that Heading Home "is at the same time emotional and highly entertaining." The Florida Sun Sentinel called it a "moving underdog story that should inspire people."

== Accolades ==
Heading Home won the Audience Award for Best Documentary at the 2018 Gold Coast International Film Festival, the Audience Award for Documentary at the 2018 Washington Jewish Film Festival, the Audience Award for Best Documentary Feature at the 2018 Philadelphia Jewish Film Festival, the Best Documentary Film Award at the 2018 Boca Raton Jewish Film Festival, and the Best Documentary Award at the 2018 Jewish Arts and Film Festival of Fairfield County.

== See also ==
- List of baseball films
