= Reeve Robert Brenner =

American rabbi

Reeve Robert Brenner (born 1936) is an American Reform rabbi, inventor and author.

== Biography ==
Brenner is a native of New York City. Since his ordination at the New York campus of the Hebrew Union College Jewish Institute of Religion in 1964, he has been a U.S. Army chaplain stationed in West Germany, senior staff chaplain at the clinical center of The National Institutes of Health(NIH), and served a number of congregations, including Bet Chesed in Maryland. As the first rabbi on the faculty of St. Vincent College and Seminary in Latrobe, PA, he taught Jewish religious thought and philosophy. His first major work, American Jewry and the Rise of Nazism, received the YIVO Jewish Scholarship Prize. His book, The Faith and Doubt of Holocaust Survivors, is the result of nine years of research conducted among survivors in Israel in order to explore the ramifications of the Holocaust upon their own personal belief and practice as Jews. This book was a finalist for the 1981 National Jewish Book Awards. Brenner is also the author of The Jewish Riddle Collection: A Yiddle's Riddles, and the books Jewish, Christian, Chewish, and Eschewish: Interfaith Pathways for the New Millennium an outgrowth of his extensive work with interfaith couples, and his defense of the reality of the Exodus entitled While the Skies were Falling.

Inspired by his young cousin, Janis Furmansky, who uses a wheelchair after an automobile accident, Brenner came up with a new sport called Bankshot while living in Israel in 1981. He wanted to develop a non-exclusionary basketball contest that entire families, including those with disabled members, could play. Sports Illustrated featured him in an article called "The Rabbi of Roundball; Rabbi Creates a new sport". He also serves as foundation president and founder of the National Association for Recreational Equality (NARE) and serves as the commissioner of the National Association of Bankshot Operators (NABO).

== Works ==
- The Faith and the Doubt of Holocaust Survivors

The Faith and Doubt of Holocaust Survivors" is without question an extraordinary achievement. When it was first published the book was clearly a classic, and now, in its revised and updated version it is even more valuable as a resource for our understanding and awareness of the thinking and feelings of those who went through one of the worst tragedies of human history.

The dictionary defines the word “classic” as a work of enduring excellence, something perfect of its kind; regarded as of first historical significance; having recognized and permanent value. To be classified as a “classic”, a book must be singular, irreplaceable and not possibly replicated. We know and acknowledge immediately that there are none others like it. For a Jewish book to be classified as a classic it must also address ultimate issues profoundly and it must be equal to the task, that is, equal to capturing and disclosing the enormity of the subject it addresses. The Faith and Doubt of Holocaust Survivors is a book that cannot be rewritten principally but not solely because the subjects are no longer with us. The generation studied for their experience of the trauma of the Shoah is no more. Besides as Prof. Alan Zuckerman has written, the book may be “the single most important research study of 20th century Jews and Judaism.”

Brenner has provided us with a rare genuine classic, meeting the above stated criteria. Replication is impossible for a study of Holocaust survivors who were teenagers before the war. Before, during, directly after and 30 years later, like stopping places at critical stages of their life’s journey, register the timeline of the longitudinal study. - Task, Arnold, Rabbi; book review in The Reform Jewish Quarterly, (Summer 2015)

- The Jewish Riddle Collection: A Yiddle's Riddles
- American Jewry and the Rise of Nazism
- Jewish, Christian, Chewish, and Eschewish: Interfaith Pathways for the New Millennium
- While the Skies were Falling: The Exodus and the Cosmos

Mind-boggling is my initial response to this magnum opus by Reeve Brenner. As I am one who claims respectable familiarity with Jewish sources, but only a layman's awareness of Catastrophic Uniformitarian theories about the cosmos, I find Reeve Brenner's focused compendium particularly challenging. His work presents as a thoroughly researched advocate for Immanuel Velikovsky's multi-works in advancing Catastrophic theories forcing the reevaluation of critical appraisals of what the biblical record really shows. This is especially so in regard to the narrative of the people of Israel's sojourn in Egypt and subsequent exodus in the time of Moses." - Landman, Nathan M, Rabbi; book review in The Reform Jewish Quarterly, (Summer 2016)

- "Extra-Biblical Evidence of the Exodus", Jewish Bible Quarterly, Sept. 2008 (vol. XXXIV; IV)
- "Nons, Nunyas, Appreciative Inquiry and the Aged", The Journal of Religion, Spirituality and Aging, (vol. 21, 2009)
- Eternal Jerusalem: Poetry

== Filmography ==
- The Life and Times of Hank Greenberg (1998) .... Himself - interviewee
- Three Faiths, One God: Judaism, Christianity, Islam

== Sources ==
- Sports Illustrated (July 1, 1991).
- Brenner, Reeve. "The Faith and the Doubt of Holocaust Survivors" Jason Aronson INC Northvale, NJ/Jerusalem, 1997.
- Reeve Robert Brenner at IMDb
- Reeve Brenner Profile at Bankshot
