= Ironbound Films =

Ironbound Films, Inc.
- Industry: Documentary/New Media
- Founded: 2003
- Founder: Seth Kramer; Daniel A. Miller; Jeremy Newberger
- Headquarters: Garrison, New York, United States
- Website: ironboundfilms.com

Ironbound Films is an American documentary film production company. Their first feature documentary was the 2008 film The Linguists, which was followed by the 2010 film The New Recruits. Another feature documentary, Évocateur: The Morton Downey Jr. Movie, is about controversial 1980s talk-show icon Morton Downey Jr. and premiered at the 2012 Tribeca Film Festival. The company also produced Heading Home: The Tale of Team Israel, a 2018 documentary film about Israel's national baseball team as it competed for the first time in the World Baseball Classic, which received an award at the 2018 Gold Coast International Film Festival, as well as several local Jewish film festivals throughout the United States. Their 2024 documentary Blind Spot covered campus antisemitism before and after the October 7 attacks on Israel.

== History ==
Ironbound Films, Inc., was founded in 2003 by Seth Kramer and Daniel A. Miller, with Jeremy Newberger joining as CEO in 2004.

Their first feature documentary The Linguists follows two linguists, Gregory Anderson and David Harrison, as they circle the globe attempting to record dying languages. The film received a positive review from Boston Globe reviewer Sam Allis. The Linguists premiered at the 2008 Sundance Film Festival before airing nationwide on PBS in February 2009. It was nominated for an Emmy Award for Outstanding Science and Technology Programming in 2010.

Their second feature documentary, The New Recruits, is about three business students attempting to bring capitalism to developing nations through social enterprise. The New Recruits was funded by the Skoll Foundation and aired on PBS in June 2010. USA Today reviewer Michele Archer gave the film a positive review, stating "Though the situation is ripe for glorification, the filmmakers unflinchingly show the challenging fish-out-of-water situations the recruits earnestly face."

Ironbound's project, Évocateur: The Morton Downey Jr. Movie, explores the life of controversial talk-show icon Morton Downey Jr., infamous in the 1980s as the "King of Trash TV." It premiered at the 2012 Tribeca Film Festival and is set for theatrical release in 2013 by Magnolia Pictures.

Heading Home: The Tale of Team Israel is a 2018 documentary film that The Jerusalem Post described as "the David-and-Goliath story of Israel's national baseball team as it competed for the first time in the World Baseball Classic." The 87-minute film won the Audience Award for Best Documentary at the 2018 Gold Coast International Film Festival, the Audience Award for Documentary at the 2018 Washington Jewish Film Festival, the Audience Award for Best Documentary Feature at the 2018 Philadelphia Jewish Film Festival, the Best Documentary Film Award at the 2018 Boca Raton Jewish Film Festival, and the Best Documentary Award at the 2018 Jewish Arts and Film Festival of Fairfield County.

== Other work ==
Ironbound's other work includes America Rebuilds II: Return to Ground Zero, a PBS documentary that aired in 2006 and chronicles the rebuilding of the World Trade Center site and the lives of those involved. It follows America Rebuilds: A Year at Ground Zero, a PBS documentary that aired in 2002 and was produced and directed by Kramer and Miller.

Ironbound also produced Moment in Time, a documentary short that premiered as the centerpiece to ESPN's Beijing Olympics coverage; and The Fantastic Two, a 17-part comedy web series about fantasy football starring William "The Refrigerator" Perry with cameos by Donald Gibb, Kato Kaelin and Richard Moll. It was sponsored by McDonald's and Honda.

Ironbound also creates videos for various clients, including corporations Cisco Systems, Sun Microsystems, and Xerox; charities LCU Foundation and Episcopal Charities; and museums Intrepid Sea-Air-Space Museum and the Franklin D. Roosevelt Presidential Library and Museum.

== Filmography ==
- Évocateur: The Morton Downey Jr. Movie
- The New Recruits
- The Linguists
- America Rebuilds II: Return to Ground Zero
- The Fantastic Two
- Heading Home: The Tale of Team Israel
