= Richard Cooler =

American Burma scholar and art historian

Richard M. Cooler
- Born: Richard M. Cooler
- Occupations: Art historian, Burma studies scholar
- Known for: Founding director of the Center for Burma Studies (NIU)

Academic work
- Institutions: Northern Illinois University

Richard M. Cooler is an American art historian specializing in Burmese (Myanmar) cultural history. He was the founding director of the Center for Burma Studies at Northern Illinois University (NIU) and has conducted research on Burmese art, architecture, and material culture.

== Career ==
Cooler taught art history at Northern Illinois University and became the founding director of the university's Center for Burma Studies in 1987.

According to NIU, he was the first American scholar permitted to conduct research in Burma since 1960, spending a total of 13 months there in 1973.

He has conducted research on Karen bronze drums, examining their manufacture and cultural use, and has published on topics such as temple architecture in Pagan. Cooler has also worked on documenting Burmese sculpture, architecture, and historical artifacts.

== Publications ==
- The Karen Bronze Drums of Burma: Types, Iconography, Manufacture and Use (Brill).
- Temples and Rainfall in Ancient Pagan, Journal of Burma Studies.
- The Art and Culture of Burma (NIU SEAsite).

== Archives ==
Cooler's correspondence, field notes, and research materials are preserved in the Burma Studies Center Archives at Northern Illinois University.
