= Episcopal Charities =

American nonprofit charity

Episcopal Charities Diocese of California
- Formation: 1977
- Type: Non-profit
- Headquarters: San Francisco, California, United States
- Region served: Alameda, Contra Costa, Marin, San Francisco, San Mateo
- Executive Director: Kathleen Piraino
- Website: http://episcopalcharities.org

Episcopal Charities is a San Francisco based nonprofit charitable organization affiliated with the Episcopal Diocese of California. In 1977, a separate division was established in the Diocese of California by the name Episcopal Community Appeal (ECA) to serve the poor, oppressed, and marginalized. In 1999, the name was changed to Episcopal Charities and it was established as a separate legal entity, a California non-profit 501(c)(3) charitable organization.

Bishop William E. Swing, the Seventh Bishop of the Diocese of California, served as board chair in the 1980s when then Mayor Dianne Feinstein recruited him to help find solutions to the problem of increasing homelessness. Since then, Episcopal Charities, one of the first organizations committed to addressing the issues of homelessness in the Bay Area, has continued to advocate for the poor and marginalized. Caspar Weinberger, the 15th United States Secretary of Defense, served as Episcopal Charities first board president alongside Bishop Swing. During his time with Episcopal Charities, Bishop Swing helped the nonprofit grow into a network of social service agencies that served more than 40,000 disadvantaged people each year.

Marc Handley Andrus, the Eighth Bishop of California in The Episcopal Church, has been serving as the board chair for Episcopal Charities since 2006 when he was installed as the Bishop of the Episcopal Diocese of California.

== Mission ==
Episcopal Charities’ mission is: “To support new and existing nonprofit agencies in their effort to make a crucial difference in the lives of poor, oppressed and endangered individuals in need in the San Francisco Bay Area, regardless of their religious affiliation or practice.”

== Operation ==
The nonprofit operates “Action Networks” that bring together volunteers who are interested in addressing the root causes of poverty in areas of healthcare, education, and environment. These Action Networks award grants to projects that the network members identify, and members provide hands-on, volunteer support to the agencies and initiatives that support these projects.

== See also ==
- Episcopal Diocese of California
