= National Museum of Anthropology =

National Museum of Anthropology may refer to:

- National Museum of Anthropology (Manila), in the Philippines
- Dr. David J. Guzmán National Museum of Anthropology, first directed by David Joaquín Guzmán, in El Salvador
- Museo Nacional de Antropología (Madrid), national museum of anthropology in Spain
- National Museum of Anthropology (Mexico) (Museo Nacional de Antropología, MNA), national museum of anthropology in Mexico City
- Museo Nacional de Arqueología y Etnología (MUNAE), national museum of archaeology, anthropology and ethnology in Guatemala
- National Museum of Archaeology, Anthropology and History of Peru, national museum of archaeology, anthropology and history in Lima
- Museu Nacional de Antropologia (Angola), in Luanda
- National Museum of Anthropology (Uruguay) in Paso de las Duranas, Montevideo
- Indira Gandhi Rashtriya Manav Sangrahalaya (lit. 'Indira Gandhi National Museum of Anthropology'), Bhopal, Madhya Pradesh, India

== See also ==
- Museum of Archaeology and Anthropology (disambiguation)
