= Gregory Anderson (linguist) =

American linguist

- Born: Gregory David Shelton Anderson
- Occupation: Linguist

Academic background
- Education: University of Chicago
- Thesis: Language Contact in South Central Siberia (2000)

Gregory David Shelton Anderson is an American linguist specializing in languages of Siberia, Munda languages, and auxiliary verbs. Anderson earned his doctorate in linguistics from the University of Chicago in 2000, and is currently director of the Living Tongues Institute for Endangered Languages. He was featured in the documentary film The Linguists.

== Books ==
Anderson is the author of books including:

- Tuvan Dictionary (with K. David Harrison, LINCOM, 2003)
- Auxiliary Verb Constructions in Altai-Sayan Turkic (Turcologica 51, Harrossowitz Verlag, 2004)
- Language contact in South Central Siberia (Turcologica 54, Harrossowitz Verlag, 2005)
- Auxiliary Verb Constructions (Oxford University Press, 2006)
- The Munda Verb: Typological Perspectives (De Gruyter, 2007)

He is also editor of an edited volume, The Munda Languages (Routledge, 2008).
