= Living Tongues Institute for Endangered Languages =

Coordinates: 44.886976°N 123.032987°W

The Living Tongues Institute for Endangered Languages (LTIEL) is a nonprofit 501 (c)(3) organization based in Salem, Oregon, United States. The institute's focus is to scientifically document endangered languages, as well as assist communities with maintaining and revitalizing knowledge of their native languages. The institute's founder and director is Dr. Gregory D. S. Anderson.

One of the institute's projects involves training indigenous youth who are not native speakers of their communities' traditional languages to record and document their elders' languages, in order to improve documentation of those languages and to "build pride" among speakers.

The institute reports that they have created over 100 online "living dictionaries". Between 2007 and 2013, the Living Tongues Institute partnered with National Geographic’s Enduring Voices Project, as both founder Dr. Gregory D. S. Anderson and former Director of Research Dr. K David Harrison are National Geographic Fellows. Other partners include La Academia de Lenguas Mayas de Guatemala and Ironbound Films: The Linguists.

== Projects ==
- Language projects
  - Altai-Sayan Language and Ethnography Project
  - Ös/Middle Chulym Documentation Project
  - Eleme/Baan Language Project
  - Kallawaya Language Project
  - Munda Languages Project
- Language Hotspots Project
  - "Enduring Voices", a multi-year joint project with the National Geographic Society launched in 2007, with expeditions to language hotspots around the world (e.g., Bolivia, East India, Oklahoma, Oregon, Australia)
- The Linguists Film Project
- Online Living Dictionary Projects

== See also ==
- Language death
- Language documentation
- Language isolate
- Language revival
- List of Language Self-Study Programs
- List of revived languages
