= The Linguists =

- Movie poster for The Linguists
- Directed by: Seth Kramer; Daniel A. Miller; Jeremy Newberger
- Written by: Daniel A. Miller
- Produced by: Seth Kramer; Daniel A. Miller; Jeremy Newberger
- Starring: Greg Anderson; K. David Harrison
- Cinematography: Seth Kramer; Jeremy Newberger
- Edited by: Anne Barliant; Seth Kramer
- Music by: Brian Hawlk
- Production company: Ironbound Films
- Release date: January 2008 (Sundance Film Festival)
- Running time: 64 minutes
- Country: United States
- Language: English

The Linguists is an independent 2008 American documentary film produced by Ironbound Films about language extinction and language documentation. It follows two linguists, Greg Anderson of the Living Tongues Institute for Endangered Languages and David Harrison of Swarthmore College, as they travel around the world to collect recordings of some of the last speakers of several moribund (dying) languages: Chulym in Siberia; Chemehuevi in Arizona, U.S.; Sora in Odisha, India; and Kallawaya in Bolivia.

== Production ==
Seth Kramer, one of the directors, describes how he first got the idea for The Linguists when, in Vilnius, Lithuania, he could not read Yiddish inscriptions on a path in spite of his Jewish heritage. He joined with Daniel A. Miller in 2003 to form Ironbound Films, and received a $520,000 grant from the National Science Foundation to support the film. Later in 2003, the directors chose Anderson and Harrison to be the protagonists of the film. In 2004, director Jeremy Newberger joined the project.

It took three years to film The Linguists, and during this time over 200 hours of film were collected. During this time, the cast and crew travelled to numerous remote areas that one reporter describes as "godforsaken," and coped with physical ailments such as altitude sickness.

The film was completed in August 2007.

== Content ==
The film begins with the fact that a large proportion of the world's languages (half, out of a total of 7,000, according to the film) are going extinct. The film's two protagonists, Anderson and Harrison, set out both to gather recordings of several endangered languages in order to document these languages later, and to educate viewers about the current rate of language extinction. In the process, they travel to the Andes Mountains in South America, to villages in Siberia, to English boarding schools in Odisha, India, and to an American Indian reservation in Arizona.

The film addresses issues including the spread of major global languages and how they contribute to language extinction; political and social reasons that some languages have been repressed; and reasons that language revitalization and language documentation are important (including both maintaining a scientific record of that language, and preserving unique local knowledge and history that is only carried in the local language).

== Reception ==
The film was screened at the 2008 Sundance Film Festival, and later had success on the "indie film circuit." It also received attention among the linguistics community on websites such as Language Log.

The film has been lauded as "the talk of the town at Sundance;" "a fascinating journey;" "funny, enlightening and ultimately uplifting;" "a hoot;" and “shaggy and bittersweet.” While it received some minor criticism for choppy, confusing editing, the subject matter has been called "fascinating" and "compelling," and the spirit of the film's protagonists has been compared to Indiana Jones.
