= K. David Harrison =

American linguist

- Born: Ponoka, Alberta, Canada
- Citizenship: United States, Canada

Academic background
- Education: American University (BA); Jagiellonian University (MA); Yale University (MPhil)(PhD)
- Thesis: Topics in the Phonology and Morphology of Tuvan (2000)
- Doctoral advisor: Stephen R. Anderson

Academic work
- Discipline: Linguist
- Sub-discipline: Environmental Linguistics
- Notable works: When Languages Die: The Extinction of the World's Languages and the Erosion of Human Knowledge; The Last Speakers: The Quest to Save the World's Most Endangered Languages; Subject of the 2008 documentary The Linguists
- Website: www.swarthmore.edu/SocSci/dharris2/index.php

K. David Harrison is a Canadian and American linguist, anthropologist, author, filmmaker, and advocate for the documentation and preservation of endangered languages.

== Biography ==
Harrison received his PhD from Yale University as a student of linguist Stephen R. Anderson, anthropologist Harold C. Conklin, and Slavist Alexander M. Schenker. He has done documentary field work on endangered languages around the world, including Turkic languages in Siberia and Mongolia including Tuvan, Tsengel Tuvan, Tofa, Chulym, Monchak, and in India on Munda, and indigenous tongues in Paraguay, Chile, Papua New Guinea, India, Vietnam, Micronesia, and Vanuatu. He specializes in phonology, morphology, and in the study of language endangerment, extinction and revitalization, digital lexicography, and environmental linguistics.

Harrison has served as a Professor, UNESCO Chairholder, and Vice-Provost at VinUniversity. He is a tenured Professor at Swarthmore College, an Explorer at the National Geographic Society and a fellow of The Explorers Club. He serves as an Affiliate Scientist at the Center for Plants, People, and Culture at the New York Botanical Garden. His early career research focused on the Turkic languages of central Siberia and western Mongolia. In 2006, Harrison created the first online "Talking Dictionary", a platform that has since expanded to cover 200+ indigenous languages. In 2007–2013, he co-directed the Enduring Voices Project at the National Geographic Society. In 2007, Harrison created the concept of "Language Hotspots", and published the first language hotspots list and map in National Geographic Magazine, in collaboration with linguist Gregory Anderson of the Living Tongues Institute for Endangered Languages. His book When Languages Die: The Extinction of the World's Languages and the Erosion of Human Knowledge (Oxford Univ. Press, 2007) has been translated into Arabic and Spanish. His book The Last Speakers: The Quest to Save the World's Most Endangered Languages (National Geographic, 2010) has been translated into Japanese and Polish.

Harrison co-starred in Ironbound Films' Emmy-nominated 2008 documentary film The Linguists. He served on the executive board of 7,000 Languages, The National Museum of Language, and BeeLine Reader Inc. He is a member of the Daylight Academy (Switzerland), and a founding member of the Center for Environmental Intelligence at VinUniversity.

He has been awarded over $5 million in research grants from the National Science Foundation, Volkswagen Stiftung, The Explorers Club, The Discovery Channel, National Geographic Society, Smithsonian Center for Folklife and Cultural Heritage, Cognitive Science Society, Swarthmore College, and Velux Stiftung, for his research on endangered languages, cultural anthropology, ethnobotany, and daylight studies. Harrison's primary research is in digital lexicography (creating Talking Dictionaries), and Environmental Linguistics in locations such as Vanuatu, Micronesia, Vietnam, and Siberia.

== Awards and honors ==
- National Merit Scholar
- Explorers Club National Fellow (2015)
- National Geographic Fellow and Explorer
- Named to the Explorers Club EC 50: Fifty People Changing the World (2021)
- QS Reimagine Education, Bronze Award (2024)
- Human Act Prize, Vietnam (2024) "Partnering with Ethnic Minorities in Vietnam to Explore Environmental Intelligence"
- Chairholder, UNESCO Chair in Environmental Leadership, Cultural Heritage, and Biodiversity. VinUniversity, Hanoi, Vietnam (2024-2028)
