= Washington Jewish Film Festival =

Film festival

- Location: Washington, D.C.
- Founded: 1989
- Hosted by: Washington, D.C. Jewish Community Center
- Website: www.wjff.org

The Washington Jewish Film Festival (WJFF), in Washington, D.C., is one of the world's oldest and largest Jewish film festivals. Focusing on Jewish and Israeli issues, the festival has shown hundreds of films ranging both in genre and theme and held in the Aaron & Cecile Goldman Theater in the Washington DC Jewish Community Center and other cinemas in Washington and suburban Maryland and Virginia. The festival was founded by Aviva Kempner in 1989 and has successfully run for over twenty years and is presented by the Washington DCJCC's Morris Cafritz Center for the Arts.

== Mission ==
Promote the preservation of Jewish culture and a diversity of narratives. The Festival provides a forum for films with Jewish themes that most often do not otherwise find a place for public exhibition in the Washington, D.C. area. Many of the films we screen only have a life on the Festival circuit and in specialty DVD-release meaning that attendees have the opportunity to experience rarely seen films.

Encourage Innovation and vitality within Jewish culture. The festival highlights films that place Jewish themes in new contexts or challenge long-held assumptions. The WJFF is at the forefront of presenting films that provide a constructive critique of Jewish identity and reconsider major cultural guideposts such as Zionism, the Holocaust and assimilation as well as the place of women, homosexuals and other people of diverse backgrounds and lifestyles in Jewish life and tradition.

Expose the widest possible audience to a low-cost, low barrier entry to the Jewish culture. Because the Jewish Diaspora has interacted with numerous host cultures over the course of its long history, the Festival seeks out films that examine some aspect of the Jewish experience, which often act as a prism through which to view multiple cultures. The festival is also dedicated to presenting films which will engage a wide audience at the lowest possible cost.

Provide a forum for audiences to interact with filmmakers and for filmmakers to receive feedback. Filmmakers attending the Festival engage in open and energetic dialogue with the Festival's audience. Through the works-in-progress program for uncompleted projects, the Festival provides new and veteran filmmakers opportunities to screen works-in-progress portions of their films for an audience at a critical point in their creative process.

== Staff, Council, and Committee ==
As of 2018 the WJFF is led by individuals following below:

WJFF Staff
- Director: Ilya Tovbis
- Associate Director of Operations: Kaitlin Whitman
- Outreach and Communications Manager: Alexis Rodriguez
- Administrative Coordinator: Carolyn Hoehner

WJFF Film Council

- Co-Chairs: Dina Gold and Sid Moskowitz
- Patty Abramson
- Michele Berman
- Anne Clemons
- Ed Cohen
- Sara Cohen
- Myrna L. Fawcett
- Stephanie Flack
- Morgan Greenhouse Genderson
- Margie Hoffman
- Joy Midman
- Eric Siegel
- Sue-Ann Siegel
- Barbara Silverstein
- Richard Solloway
- Diana Wattenberg
- WJFF Advisor and Founder: Aviva Kempner

WJFF Year-Round is the year-round exhibition arm of the Washington Jewish Film Festival, presenting entertaining and thought-provoking features, documentaries, and shorts from around the world on a (approximately) weekly basis at the Aaron & Cecile Goldman Theater at the Edlavitch DCJCC. Most screenings are accompanied by speakers, including filmmakers and scholars.

== Films ==
Heading Home: The Tale of Team Israel, a 2018 documentary film about the underdog Israel national baseball team competing for the first time in the World Baseball Classic, won the Audience Award for Best Documentary at the 2018 Washington Jewish Film Festival.
