= List of tornadoes in the outbreak of January 21–23, 2017 =

From January 21–23, 2017, the second-largest tornado outbreak for the month of January took place across the Southeastern United States, spawning 82 tornadoes.

== Confirmed tornadoes ==
=== January 21 event ===
List of confirmed tornadoes – Saturday, January 21, 2017 (Note: All dates are based on the local time zone where the tornado touched down; however, all times are in Coordinated Universal Time for consistency.)
EF#	Location	County / Parish	State	Start Coord.	Time (UTC)	Path length	Max width
EF3	NW of Purvis to Hattiesburg/Petal to NE of Runnelstown	Lamar, Forrest, Perry	MS	31.1855°N 89.4799°W	0935–1013	31.06 mi (49.99 km)	900 yd (820 m)
EF3	4 deaths – See section on this tornado – 57 people were injured.						
EF2	SE of Gilbertown to E of Putnam	Choctaw, Marengo	AL	31.8476°N 88.2905°W	1114–1137	20.43 mi (32.88 km)	800 yd (730 m)
EF2	Five homes were destroyed, including three mobile homes, and dozens of other structures sustained varying degree of damage. Four people were injured.						
EF1	E of Wayne	Marengo	AL	32.0988°N 87.7823°W	1155–1201	4.20 mi (6.76 km)	900 yd (820 m)
EF1	Several trees were downed, and a few outbuildings were damaged.						
EF1	Southern LaGrange	Troup	GA	32.9792°N 85.0487°W	1349–1402	5.42 mi (8.72 km)	200 yd (180 m)
EF1	A metal building had part of its roof ripped off and garage doors blown in. Homes and a church sustained minor roof damage, and a sign was blown over. A trampoline was thrown 30 yards, and trees were snapped and uprooted along the path as well. Total economic losses reached $50,000.						
EF1	SE of Blue Ridge	Elmore	AL	32.4692°N 86.1733°W	1355–1356	0.68 mi (1.09 km)	200 yd (180 m)
EF1	A dozen trees were downed, one of which destroyed an outbuilding.						
EF1	Wetumpka	Elmore	AL	32.5299°N 86.2179°W	1355–1358	1.54 mi (2.48 km)	450 yd (410 m)
EF1	Several structures in Wetumpka were damaged, including a church. Trees were snapped and uprooted as well.						
EF0	S of Emerald Mountain	Elmore	AL	32.4359°N 86.1064°W	1357	0.21 mi (0.34 km)	90 yd (82 m)
EF0	Fencing, trees, and metal siding were damaged at Emerald Mountain Christian Academy.						
EF1	W of Marvyn	Macon, Lee	AL	32.4740°N 85.4557°W	1448–1450	2.84 mi (4.57 km)	100 yd (91 m)
EF1	Two homes suffered roof damage and several trees were snapped.						
EF0	S of Auburn	Lee	AL	32.5267°N 85.4825°W	1449–1453	2.38 mi (3.83 km)	150 yd (140 m)
EF0	Several trees were snapped or uprooted.						
EF1	N of Goshen to Troy to E of Louisville	Pike, Barbour	AL	31.7870°N 86.1345°W	1455–1538	37.47 mi (60.30 km)	400 yd (370 m)
EF1	A mobile home was severely damaged, injuring two occupants. Minor roof and gutter damage was inflicted to other homes, outbuildings were damaged or destroyed, and groves of trees were snapped or uprooted by this long-track but weak tornado. Damage to trees occurred in Troy, one of which was uprooted and landed on a home, causing structural damage. Near the end of the path, homes sustained minor shingle damage in the northern part of Louisville.						
EF0	N of Beauregard	Lee	AL	32.5626°N 85.3572°W	1456–1458	1.07 mi (1.72 km)	150 yd (140 m)
EF0	A weak tornado damaged shingles and snapped or uprooted several trees.						
EF0	SSE of Opelika	Lee	AL	32.6138°N 85.3677°W	1500–1501	0.82 mi (1.32 km)	150 yd (140 m)
EF0	Several structures sustained damage to their shingles, and numerous pine trees were downed.						
EF0	NW of Crawford	Lee	AL	32.4811°N 85.2189°W	1508	0.13 mi (0.21 km)	50 yd (46 m)
EF0	Several roofs and wooden fences were damaged.						
EF1	Smiths Station	Lee	AL	32.5294°N 85.1094°W	1519–1520	0.95 mi (1.53 km)	300 yd (270 m)
EF1	Dozens of trees were downed. Several buildings at the Smiths Station School Athletic Complex were destroyed and others were damaged.						
EF1	WSW of Cataula to W of Waverly Hall	Harris	GA	32.6812°N 84.9462°W	1533–1551	10.84 mi (17.45 km)	400 yd (370 m)
EF1	Several homes sustained substantial roof damage, an outdoor shelter was destroyed, and numerous large trees were snapped or uprooted. Intense pressure falls near the tornado caused four to six biscuit cans at a super market to pop open. Total economic losses reached $75,000.						
EF0	SW of Woodland	Talbot	GA	32.7684°N 84.6379°W	1606–1610	1.92 mi (3.09 km)	100 yd (91 m)
EF0	Numerous trees were snapped in a wilderness area. Total economic losses reached $10,000.						
EF1	NE of Woodland to SSE of Sunset Village	Talbot, Upson	GA	32.8097°N 84.5331°W	1614–1628	9.52 mi (15.32 km)	300 yd (270 m)
EF1	Numerous trees were snapped or uprooted, a small shed was destroyed, and a small building was overturned. Total economic losses reached $65,000.						
EF1	E of Junction City to SSW of Salem	Taylor	GA	32.5937°N 84.3997°W	1618–1633	12.25 mi (19.71 km)	400 yd (370 m)
EF1	Two metal barns were destroyed, a small silo was ripped out of the ground and thrown over 300 yd (270 m), and numerous trees were snapped or uprooted. A single-story home and a trailer sustained significant roof, window, and siding damage. Total economic losses reached $100,000.						
EF2	ESE of Sprewell Bluff State Park to N of Sunset Village	Talbot, Upson	GA	32.8318°N 84.4239°W	1622–1629	5.68 mi (9.14 km)	300 yd (270 m)
EF2	Hundreds of trees were snapped or uprooted. One home was severely damaged while several others sustained less severe roof damage. Total economic losses reached $300,000.						
EF1	S of Sunset Village to Western Thomaston	Upson	GA	32.8477°N 84.4077°W	1625–1634	5.26 mi (8.47 km)	200 yd (180 m)
EF1	One home sustained significant roof damage, a second sustained moderate roof damage, and a third had its porch ripped off. Numerous trees and power lines were downed as the tornado entered the western part of Thomaston before dissipating. Total economic losses reached $75,000.						
EF0	SW of Hannahs Mill	Upson	GA	32.9182°N 84.36°W	1632–1634	0.78 mi (1.26 km)	100 yd (91 m)
EF0	Numerous trees were downed or snapped, causing a car accident. Total economic losses reached $20,000.						
EF1	NE of Hannahs Mill	Upson	GA	32.9499°N 84.3131°W	1639–1641	1.87 mi (3.01 km)	175 yd (160 m)
EF1	A home had a portion of its roof ripped off, numerous trees were snapped or uprooted, and an outbuilding lost wood or metal roof panels. Total economic losses reached $20,000.						
EF1	S of Marshallville	Macon	GA	32.4111°N 84.009°W	1659–1707	8.92 mi (14.36 km)	100 yd (91 m)
EF1	Three irrigation systems were overturned, structures sustained minor roof damage, and trees were damaged. Total economic losses reached $30,000.						
EF0	SE of Forsyth	Monroe	GA	32.9113°N 83.8972°W	1708–1720	8.84 mi (14.23 km)	250 yd (230 m)
EF0	Several dozen trees were snapped or uprooted, and a residence sustained minor roof damage. Total economic losses reached $15,000.						
EF2	SE of Fort Valley to Warner Robins	Peach, Houston	GA	32.5114°N 83.7901°W	1711–1729	12.85 mi (20.68 km)	250 yd (230 m)
EF2	A rain-wrapped tornado damaged dozens of homes, snapped or uprooted countless trees, and downed brick fences in Warner Robins. One home had much its roof torn off, while others were damaged to a lesser degree. Projectiles were driven through exterior walls and into the ground. A sports complex and a business were damaged, and 15 to 20 mobile homes were severely damaged in a mobile home park. Two large HVAC units were tossed 50 yd (46 m) from the top of a Walmart, where the auto bay doors on the back of the store were blown in, the roof was lifted, and rafters were twisted. Total economic losses reached $295,000.						
EF0	WSW of Danville	Twiggs	GA	32.535°N 83.385°W	1746–1752	4.23 mi (6.81 km)	100 yd (91 m)
EF0	Approximately 100 trees were downed, and one section of an irrigation system was overturned. Total economic losses reached $50,000.						
EF1	NE of Cochran	Bleckley	GA	32.444°N 83.313°W	1750–1755	4.32 mi (6.95 km)	100 yd (91 m)
EF1	A fence and numerous trees were downed. The roof was lifted off a small barn, three homes sustained roof damage, and an abandoned fire station was damaged. Total economic losses reached $30,000.						
EF1	E of Irwinton	Wilkinson	GA	32.797°N 83.170°W	1754–1811	5.84 mi (9.40 km)	100 yd (91 m)
EF1	Multiple trees were snapped or uprooted. Total economic losses reached $10,000.						
EF0	Lake Sinclair	Putnam	GA	33.1792°N 83.3430°W	1810–1812	0.57 mi (0.92 km)	50 yd (46 m)
EF0	Several softwood trees were snapped or uprooted, damaging some homes. Total economic losses reached $25,000.						
EF0	N of Dublin	Laurens	GA	32.671°N 82.915°W	1820–1826	2.18 mi (3.51 km)	85 yd (78 m)
EF0	A couple dozen trees were uprooted. Total economic losses reached $12,000.						
EF1	W of Deepstep	Hancock, Baldwin	GA	33.0525°N 83.0967°W	1828–1830	0.53 mi (0.85 km)	70 yd (64 m)
EF1	Numerous trees were snapped or uprooted. One residence had a portion of its tin roof peeled off while a second sustained damage to its awning and siding. Total economic losses reached $10,000.						
EF0	SE of Wrightsville	Johnson	GA	32.688°N 82.641°W	1839–1848	6.39 mi (10.28 km)	100 yd (91 m)
EF0	A small outbuilding had its metal roof panels ripped off, a metal building sustained major roof damage, and multiple trees were snapped or uprooted. Total economic losses reached $10,000.						
EF1	S of Tennille	Washington	GA	32.896°N 82.820°W	1840–1846	2.59 mi (4.17 km)	300 yd (270 m)
EF1	One mobile home was destroyed while another was severely damaged. Trees were damaged. Total economic losses reached $30,000.						
EF1	ESE of Tennille	Washington	GA	32.924°N 82.779°W	1845–1849	1.3 mi (2.1 km)	300 yd (270 m)
EF1	Shingles were torn from roofs, a shed was destroyed, and a mobile home was rolled and destroyed. Total economic losses reached $50,000.						
EF1	E of Tennille	Washington	GA	32.950°N 82.730°W	1846–1859	8.38 mi (13.49 km)	300 yd (270 m)
EF1	Numerous trees were downed, including dozens of pecan trees which were uprooted in an orchard. Total economic losses reached $60,000.						
EF0	NW of Midville	Burke	GA	32.8601°N 82.2922°W	1909–1912	1.3 mi (2.1 km)	250 yd (230 m)
EF0	An irrigation system was turned over and several trees were downed.						
EF0	SW of Canoochee	Emanuel	GA	32.6596°N 82.1848°W	1911–1915	4.8 mi (7.7 km)	200 yd (180 m)
EF0	A residence had its porch blown off, an outbuilding was destroyed, an outbuilding had its metal roofing panels ripped off, and numerous trees were snapped or uprooted. Total economic losses reached $50,000.						
EF0	SSE of Vidette	Burke	GA	32.9581°N 82.1649°W	1923–1925	1.5 mi (2.4 km)	100 yd (91 m)
EF0	The roof of a metal barn and several calf weaning huts were damaged.						
EF1	ESE of Waynesboro	Burke	GA	33.0648°N 81.9642°W	1940–1945	1 mi (1.6 km)	75 yd (69 m)
EF1	The exterior wall of a metal building was shredded, and numerous trees were snapped or uprooted.						
EF0	SW of Hiltonia	Screven	GA	32.82°N 81.76°W	1942–1945	0.69 mi (1.11 km)	50 yd (46 m)
EF0	A carport attached to a residence was damaged, metal roofing was ripped from four storage buildings, and significant tree damage was observed.						
EF0	W of Glennville	Tattnall	GA	31.93°N 82.09°W	1950–1952	0.91 mi (1.46 km)	250 yd (230 m)
EF0	Five chicken coops were heavily damaged, with metal roofing scattered 500 yd (460 m) downwind. A home sustained minor shingle damage, and several trees were downed or uprooted.						
EF1	NE of Sylvania	Screven	GA	32.78°N 81.61°W	1952–1957	2.7 mi (4.3 km)	525 yd (480 m)
EF1	A motor vehicle was rolled downhill, the northeast wall of a metal firehouse was ripped off, and metal roofing was torn from several houses and outbuildings. A stop sign was tossed 50 yd (46 m), numerous trees were snapped or uprooted, and six headstones weighing up 200–400 lb (91–181 kg) were toppled.						
EF2	N of Barnwell to NNW of Denmark	Barnwell, Bamberg	SC	33.2942°N 81.4055°W	2040–2102	15.9 mi (25.6 km)	1,600 yd (1,500 m)
EF2	Hundreds of softwood and hardwood trees were snapped or uprooted by this large wedge tornado, with numerous trees landing on homes and causing structural damage. Several structures were heavily damaged or destroyed, most notably a mobile home which was rolled several times and had its floors separated from the undercarriage. The inside occupant was injured. Several chicken houses suffered extensive roof damage.						
EF1	NW of Cope	Orangeburg	SC	33.3761°N 81.0839°W	2109–2119	5.47 mi (8.80 km)	400 yd (370 m)
EF1	Numerous trees were snapped or uprooted, three mobile homes were heavily damaged, and a metal farm building collapsed.						
EF2	N of Scottsville	Harrison	TX	32.5199°N 94.2529°W	2218–2235	6.93 mi (11.15 km)	230 yd (210 m)
EF2	Numerous trees were snapped or uprooted, and numerous power lines were downed. One home had its roof ripped off while several others were damaged to a lesser extent, many by falling trees. Mobile homes were also damaged, outbuildings were destroyed, and a vehicle was overturned as well. Total economic losses reached $1,000,000.						
EF1	WNW of Jefferson	Marion	TX	32.7724°N 94.4179°W	2219–2223	0.81 mi (1.30 km)	100 yd (91 m)
EF1	Numerous trees were snapped or uprooted, and numerous power lines were downed. A single-wide mobile home had its roof ripped off, and a tree landed on an outbuilding. Total economic losses reached $250,000.						
EF2	NNW of Uncertain, TX to SW of Rodessa, LA	Marion (TX), Cass (TX), Caddo (LA)	TX, LA	32.8087°N 94.1962°W	2250–2328	13.36 mi (21.50 km)	800 yd (730 m)
EF2	A strong wedge tornado passed near the town of Vivian, snapping and uprooting numerous trees and downing many power lines. Several vehicles were pushed, a party barge boat was moved 200 yd (180 m) into a grove of trees, and a travel trailer was flipped. A house lost its entire roof and a back exterior wall, and a mobile home was shifted off its foundation. A woman was taking shelter in a bathtub inside the house that had its roof and back wall torn off. The tornado carried her through the air while she was in the tub and then deposited her in a wooded area, where she remained in the bathtub unharmed. Total economic losses reached $900,000.						
EF2	ESE of Plain Dealing to W of Cullen	Bossier, Webster	LA	32.8883°N 93.6432°W	2312–2337	10.79 mi (17.36 km)	990 yd (910 m)
EF2	Numerous trees were snapped or uprooted, and numerous power lines were downed by this large wedge tornado. Two mobile homes were rolled and completely destroyed, several outbuildings were destroyed, and several houses sustained damage to their roofs and walls. In Webster Parish, a building in an ATV park had part of its roof removed. One person was knocked unconscious by a flying piece of lumber. Total economic losses reached $825,000.						
EF1	S of Shongaloo	Webster	LA	32.8875°N 93.3193°W	2355–0007	3.5 mi (5.6 km)	350 yd (320 m)
EF1	Numerous trees were snapped or uprooted; a tree fell on a carport and a portion of a mobile home. Total economic losses reached $10,000.						
EF2	NE of Natchez	Natchitoches	LA	31.6824°N 93.0381°W	2356–0003	2.04 mi (3.28 km)	300 yd (270 m)
EF2	Numerous power lines were downed, and numerous trees were snapped or uprooted. Five homes sustained significant damage, including one that had its roof ripped off and three exterior walls collapsed. Several outbuildings were severely damaged. One person suffered an arm injury. Total economic losses reached $500,000.						
EF1	ESE of Aloha	Grant	LA	31.5566°N 92.7473°W	0100–0113	2.23 mi (3.59 km)	150 yd (140 m)
EF1	Numerous power lines were downed, and numerous trees were snapped or uprooted; fallen trees severely damaged one home and impacted a cemetery. A single-wide mobile home was flipped and rolled about 25 yards (23 m), injuring a woman inside. Several barns or outbuildings were damaged, a 3,000 lb (1,400 kg) trailer was flipped, killing a cow, and a large television antenna was toppled onto a home.						
EF1	WSW of El Dorado	Union	AR	33.1731°N 92.807°W	0104–0109	2.89 mi (4.65 km)	75 yd (69 m)
EF1	Several pine trees were snapped or uprooted, one of which fell onto a home, damaging a small antenna tower.						
EF0	Lawson	Union	AR	33.1908°N 92.4782°W	0138–0140	0.61 mi (0.98 km)	50 yd (46 m)
EF0	A single-wide mobile home had a portion of its roof peeled back and a portion of one wall detached. A few small trees were snapped.						
EF1	S of Georgetown	Grant	LA	31.6287°N 92.4199°W	0151–0154	1.24 mi (2.00 km)	150 yd (140 m)
EF1	Numerous trees were snapped or uprooted, one of which caused severe damage to a home. Shingles were removed from several structures.						
EF1	Jena	LaSalle	LA	31.6792°N 92.1562°W	0229–0230	0.16 mi (0.26 km)	100 yd (91 m)
EF1	Numerous trees were snapped or uprooted in town, one of which fell on a church. A wooden barn was damaged, a gas station canopy was blown 50 yd (46 m), and a local business' brick facade collapsed. Storage buildings were heavily damaged as well.						
EF0	NW of Hamburg	Ashley	AR	33.2393°N 91.82°W	0245–0246	0.67 mi (1.08 km)	50 yd (46 m)
EF0	Picture evidence of a brief tornado was relayed.						
EF0	SE of Marion	Union	LA	32.8663°N 92.1666°W	0248–0249	0.62 mi (1.00 km)	50 yd (46 m)
EF0	A metal shed sustained considerable damage, an outbuilding had its metal roof ripped off, and a few small trees were snapped.						
EF1	NNE of Mer Rouge	Morehouse	LA	32.8212°N 91.7873°W	0304–0323	8.87 mi (14.27 km)	300 yd (270 m)
EF1	Mt. Olive Missionary Baptist Church and a few houses sustained roof damage. A television antenna was bent, numerous trees were snapped or uprooted, and power poles were toppled. A shed building roof collapsed, tin was blown around, and a large metal and PVC tank were blown over.						
EF2	E of Meridian Station	Lauderdale	MS	32.4914°N 88.602°W	0444–0454	7.28 mi (11.72 km)	550 yd (500 m)
EF2	Numerous trees were snapped or uprooted, many of which caused structural damage upon falling. A church sustained minor roof damage. Many mobile homes were thrown or rolled, destroying four and injuring an occupant in the process. The undercarriage of one mobile home was found wrapped around a tree.						

=== January 22 event ===
List of confirmed tornadoes – Sunday, January 22, 2017
EF#	Location	County / Parish	State	Start Coord.	Time (UTC)	Path length	Max width
EF0	S of Coaling	Tuscaloosa	AL	33.0439°N 87.3412°W	0636–0637	0.03 mi (0.048 km)	200 yd (180 m)
EF0	A brief tornado downed a few trees and damaged one home.						
EF2	N of Thomasville to NE of Pavo	Thomas, Brooks	GA	30.8997°N 83.9821°W	0756–0818	18.67 mi (30.05 km)	700 yd (640 m)
EF2	A house lost a significant amount of roof deck, a mobile home was completely destroyed, and numerous pine trees were snapped or uprooted. A few other houses were damaged to a lesser degree. Three people were injured.						
EF3	WSW of Barney to S of Adel to SE of Nashville	Brooks, Cook, Berrien	GA	30.9998°N 83.5841°W	0829–0858	24.66 mi (39.69 km)	700 yd (640 m)
EF3	11 deaths – See section on this tornado – 45 people were injured.						
EF1	SW of Pembroke	Liberty	GA	32.01°N 81.67°W	0925–0927	0.59 mi (0.95 km)	250 yd (230 m)
EF1	At least 100 trees were damaged.						
EF1	Baxley	Jeff Davis, Appling	GA	31.7404°N 82.5428°W	1052–1058	11.12 mi (17.90 km)	1,900 yd (1,700 m)
EF1	EF1 damage was inflicted to Zoar Methodist Church and surrounding areas as a result of this large wedge tornado.						
EF1	NW of Valdosta	Lowndes	GA	30.8897°N 83.3891°W	1200–1204	4.84 mi (7.79 km)	400 yd (370 m)
EF1	Multiple homes had shingles ripped off, a large barn was destroyed, and numerous large pine trees were snapped or uprooted.						
EF1	E of Headland	Henry	AL	31.3377°N 85.2515°W	1902–1914	5.52 mi (8.88 km)	100 yd (91 m)
EF1	A mobile home was destroyed, a few structures sustained minor roof damage, and numerous trees were snapped or uprooted.						
EF1	NW of Inverness	Bullock	AL	32.1254°N 85.9570°W	1906–1911	2.20 mi (3.54 km)	330 yd (300 m)
EF1	At least one home and many trees suffered damage.						
EF2	NNE of Bluffton to E of Coleman	Clay, Calhoun, Randolph	GA	31.5704°N 84.8654°W	1938–1952	12.03 mi (19.36 km)	400 yd (370 m)
EF2	A mobile home was flipped, injuring the occupant. Two homes had their entire roofing structures ripped off while several others sustained lesser damage. Numerous trees were snapped or uprooted.						
EF0	Southwestern Auburn	Lee	AL	32.5302°N 85.5572°W	1946–1956	4.92 mi (7.92 km)	200 yd (180 m)
EF0	The roof of a mobile home was peeled back, apartment buildings sustained shingle damage, and small pine trees were snapped or uprooted.						
EF1	NE of Apalachicola	Franklin	FL	29.8217°N 84.9188°W	1950–1954	2.36 mi (3.80 km)	350 yd (320 m)
EF1	Pine trees were snapped or uprooted.						
EF1	Western Opelika	Lee	AL	32.6262°N 85.4207°W	2000–2007	3.09 mi (4.97 km)	540 yd (490 m)
EF1	Homes were damaged, including one small house that lost most of its roof. Numerous trees were snapped or uprooted, some of which landed on structures.						
EF3	SE of Albany to W of Abbeville	Dougherty, Worth, Turner, Crisp, Wilcox	GA	31.4373°N 84.3447°W	2015–2127	70.69 mi (113.76 km)	2,200 yd (2,000 m)
EF3	5 deaths - 2017 Albany tornado						
EF1	Cordele	Crisp	GA	31.916°N 83.808°W	2052–2102	6.93 mi (11.15 km)	300 yd (270 m)
EF1	Homes and mobile homes sustained roof damage in town, including 81 mobile homes at the Shady Lane mobile home park. Trees were downed as well.						
EF1	N of Cochran	Bleckley	GA	32.4220°N 83.3588°W	2115–2119	2.24 mi (3.60 km)	100 yd (91 m)
EF1	Numerous trees were snapped or uprooted.						
EF0	NW of Cary	Bleckley	GA	32.524°N 83.317°W	2122–2123	0.56 mi (0.90 km)	50 yd (46 m)
EF0	A few trees were uprooted.						
EF1	NNE of Willacoochee	Atkinson, Coffee	GA	31.4020°N 83.0281°W	2147–2154	3.11 mi (5.01 km)	1,200 yd (1,100 m)
EF1	Four chicken houses were damaged, of which two were completely destroyed.						
EF1	Woodbine	Camden	GA	30.9007°N 81.8579°W	2326–2347	16.64 mi (26.78 km)	120 yd (110 m)
EF1	Homes in a subdivision were heavily damaged at high-end EF1 strength. Significant tree damage was observed, with some trees landing on and damaging homes.						
EF1	W of Woodbine	Camden	GA	30.9541°N 81.8902°W	2329–2331	1.65 mi (2.66 km)	120 yd (110 m)
EF1	A tornado debris signature was observed on Dual Pol radar products.						

=== January 23 event ===
List of confirmed tornadoes – Monday, January 23, 2017
EF#	Location	County / Parish	State	Start Coord.	Time (UTC)	Path length	Max width
EF1	N of Loxahatchee	Palm Beach	FL	26.7896°N 80.3272°W	0625–0630	3.22 mi (5.18 km)	90 yd (82 m)
EF1	Trees and fences were damaged.						
EF1	Palm Beach Gardens	Palm Beach	FL	26.8596°N 80.1432°W	0640–0649	5.79 mi (9.32 km)	130 yd (120 m)
EF1	This tornado caused damage in the Palm Beach Gardens neighborhood. Damage occurred to the private high school's football stadium and the public high school's building and baseball stadium. Minor damage also occurred at Juno Beach Pier and a nearby mobile home park. Total economic losses reached at least $500,000 to $1,000,000.						
EF1	Miami Springs to Hialeah	Miami-Dade	FL	25.8162°N 80.3258°W	0845–0848	2.79 mi (4.49 km)	123 yd (112 m)
EF1	A weak tornado touched down just east of the Palmetto Expressway (SR 826) in Miami Springs and tracked east-northeast. Damage continued into Hialeah near a water plant before the tornado lifted.						

== See also ==
- Weather of 2017
- List of North American tornadoes and tornado outbreaks
- Tornadoes of 2017
  - List of United States tornadoes from January to March 2017
- Lists of tornadoes and tornado outbreaks
