= Gertrude Jeannette =

American playwright and actress (1914–2018)

- Born: November 28, 1914; Urbana, Arkansas, U.S.
- Died: April 4, 2018 (aged 103); Harlem, New York, U.S.
- Occupations: Actress, playwright, motorist
- Years active: 1945–1977

Gertrude Hadley Jeannette (November 28, 1914 – April 4, 2018) was an American playwright and film and stage actress. She is also known for being the first woman to work as a licensed taxi driver in New York City, which she began doing in 1942. Despite being blacklisted during the Red Scare in the 1950s, she wrote five plays and founded the H.A.D.L.E.Y. Players in Harlem, New York, remaining active in mentoring African-American actors in New York City. In the 1960s and 1970s she appeared in Broadway productions such as The Long Dream, Nobody Loves an Albatross, The Amen Corner, The Skin of Our Teeth and Vieux Carré. She also appeared in films such as Cotton Comes to Harlem in 1969, Shaft in 1971, and Black Girl in 1972. She acted into her 80s and retired from directing theater at the age of 98.

== Early life and education ==
Gertrude Jeannette was born on November 28, 1914, in Urbana, Arkansas. Salley Getrude Crawford Hadley, her mother, was a homemaker. Willis Lawrence Hadley, her father, taught on a Native American reservation near Spiro, Oklahoma. Gertrude Jeannette had five brothers and one sister, and grew up on a farm. The family moved to Little Rock, Arkansas during the Great Depression, and she enrolled at the segregated Dunbar High School.

== Career ==
=== Motorist and cab driver ===
In 1935 she became the first woman to get a license to drive a motorcycle in New York City, and she joined her husband's motorcycle club in the early 1940s. In 1942, she took and passed the cab driver's test and became the first female cab driver in New York City.

In 1949, she was present at the Peekskill Riots, when the Ku Klux Klan attempted to lynch Paul Robeson. Her husband worked as a bodyguard for Robeson, and during the riot, she and her husband rushed to the motorcycles to help get Robeson out.

=== Theater career ===
Using money she earned as a taxi driver, she enrolled in a speech class to help manage her stammer. The one class she could find was at the American Negro Theater in Harlem. Acting was part of the curriculum, and because of that, she studied along with notable actors such as Sidney Poitier, Ruby Dee and Ossie Davis. "Singled out for her stage presence," in 1945, she played her first lead role in the play Our Town. She continued to drive a cab until 1949, when she landed a role in Lost in the Stars, her first Broadway production.

She began writing plays in 1950, writing about strong women that "no one would be ashamed to play." She wrote five plays, and as a "demanding" director, she mentored young black actors in New York. Her first play was her favorite. Titled The Way Forward and premiered in 1950, it related to her childhood. Jeannette also performed in it. Jeannette relates being blacklisted during the Red Scare of the 1950s due to her association with her friend Paul Robeson, who was also blacklisted. Even though blacklisted, she set up a succession of theater companies in Harlem.

In the 1960s and 1970s she appeared in a number of Broadway theater productions. Among them were The Long Dream (1960), Nobody Loves an Albatross (1963), The Amen Corner (1965), The Skin of Our Teeth (1975) and Vieux Carré (1977). In 1970 she appeared in the film Cotton Comes to Harlem, and in 1972 she appeared in the film Black Girl. Her film credits also include Shaft.

In 1979, she founded the H.A.D.L.E.Y. players (Harlem Artist's Development League Especially for You). She acted into her 80s, retiring from directing at the age of 98.

Jeannette was one of several prominent African American theater directors featured in the 13 minute documentary Drama Mamas: Black Women Theatre Directors In the Spotlight and Remembered, which was shown at the Reel Sisters of the Diaspora Film Festival in Brooklyn, New York in March 2006.

== Personal life ==
Her husband, Joe Jeannette, first proposed to her on her prom night, and she refused, "walking off the floor." They eloped to New York in 1933. Her only son, Robert, was born in 1935, dying at age five. Her husband, a prizefighter and president of the motorcycle club the Harlem Dusters, died in 1956.

She turned 100 in November 2014. She died on April 4, 2018, at the age of 103 at her home in Harlem. She was survived by many nephews and nieces.

== Filmography ==
Title	Year	Role	Notes
Nothing But a Man	1964	Mrs Dawson	
Cotton Comes to Harlem	1970	Sister Minnie	
Shaft	1971	Old Lady	
The Legend of Nigger Charley	1972	Theo	
Come Back Charleston Blue	1972		
Black Girl	1972	Sister Jenkins	(final film role)

== Playwright credits ==
- A Bolt from the Blue (1948)
- This Way Forward (1948-1950)
- Light in the Cellar (1960)
- Open House (1974)
- Who's Mama's Baby, Who's Daddy's Child? (1985)
- Gladys' Dilemma (1990)

== Theater credits ==
Title	Year	Role
Vieux Carre	1977	Nursie
Nobody Loves an Albatross	1963-64	Sarah Washington
Lost in the Stars	1949-50	Grace Kumalo

== Awards ==
- 1984 AUDELCO Outstanding Pioneer Award
- 1987 AT&T and Black American Newspaper's Personality of the Year Award
- 1991 Living Legend Award at the National Black Theatre Festival in Winston-Salem, North Carolina
- 1992 Harlem Business Recognition Award from the Manhattan Section of the National Council of Negro Women
- 1998 Lionel Hampton Legacy Award
- 1999 Inducted into the Arkansas Black Hall of Fame
- 2002 Paul Robeson Award from the Actors’ Equity Association
- 2004 Giving Back Award from the Giving Back Corporation
- 2010 AUDELCO Nomination in three categories for Best Play Revival for her play Gladys' Dilemma
