= El Dorado School District =

El Dorado School District may refer to:

- El Dorado School District (Arkansas), based in El Dorado, Arkansas
- El Dorado School District (Kansas), based in El Dorado, Kansas.
- El Dorado Union High School District, based in El Dorado County, California.
