= Urbana, Arkansas =

- Census-designated place
- Location within Arkansas Location within the United States
- Coordinates: 33°09′30″N 92°26′43″W
- Country: United States
- State: Arkansas
- County: Union
- Elevation: 148 ft (45 m)

Population (2020)
  - Total: 177
- Time zone: UTC-6 (Central (CST))
  - Summer (DST): UTC-5 (CDT)
- ZIP code: 71730
- Area code: 870
- GNIS feature ID: 2805690

Urbana is an unincorporated community and census-designated place (CDP) in Union County, Arkansas, United States. Urbana is 13 miles (21 km) east-southeast of El Dorado. Urbana has a post office with ZIP code 71768. It was first listed as a CDP in the 2020 census with a population of 177.

== Education ==
It is in the El Dorado School District. The district operates El Dorado High School.

In 1978 the Lawson and Urbana school districts merged into the El Dorado district.

== Demographics ==
Historical population
Census	Pop.	Note	%±
2020	177		—
U.S. Decennial Census; 2020

=== 2020 census ===
Urbana CDP, Arkansas – Demographic Profile (NH = Non-Hispanic) Note: the US Census treats Hispanic/Latino as an ethnic category. This table excludes Latinos from the racial categories and assigns them to a separate category. Hispanics/Latinos may be of any race.
Race / Ethnicity	Pop 2020	% 2020
White alone (NH)	136	76.84%
Black or African American alone (NH)	9	5.08%
Native American or Alaska Native alone (NH)	1	0.00%
Asian alone (NH)	0	0.56%
Pacific Islander alone (NH)	0	0.00%
Some Other Race alone (NH)	0	0.00%
Mixed Race/Multi-Racial (NH)	2	1.13%
Hispanic or Latino (any race)	29	16.38%
Total	177	100.00%

== Notable people ==
- Gertrude Jeannette (1914-2018), actress, was born in Urbana.
