= 2013 Hattiesburg tornado =

Tornado in Mississippi, United States

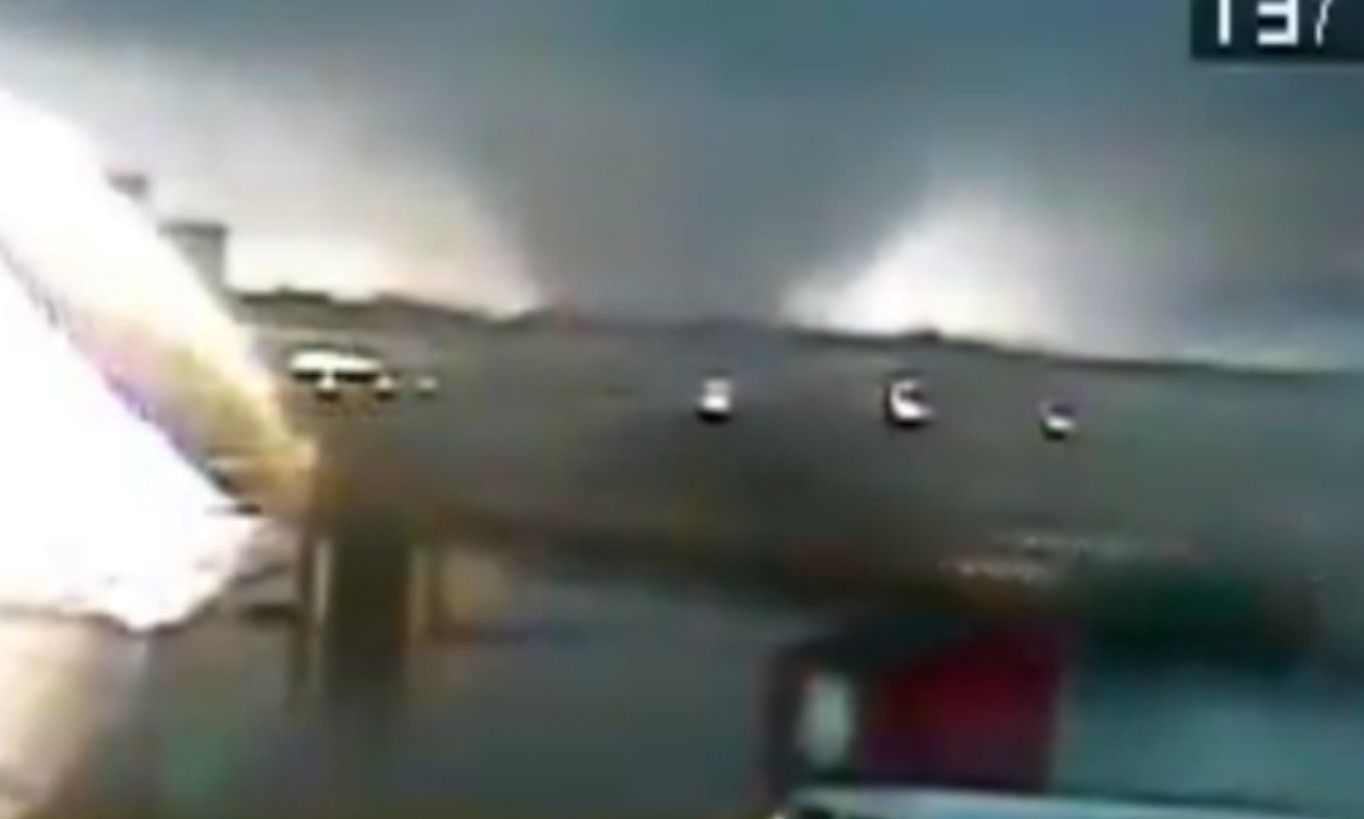
- A CCTV still of the tornado as it moved through Hattiesburg

Meteorological history
- Formed: February 10, 2013, 5:03 p.m. CST
- Dissipated: February 10, 2013, 5:36 p.m. CST
- Duration: 33 minutes

EF4 tornado
- on the Enhanced Fujita scale
- Highest winds: 170 mph (270 km/h)

Overall effects
- Fatalities: 0
- Injuries: 71
- Damage: $38.525 million
- Areas affected: Hattiesburg, West Hattiesburg, and Petal, Mississippi, US
- Part of the Tornadoes of 2013

In the afternoon hours of February 10, 2013, a large multiple-vortex tornado devastated the cities of West Hattiesburg, Hattiesburg, and Petal, Mississippi. The tornado was one of eight that touched down in southern Mississippi and southwestern Alabama that day. It reached a maximum path width of 0.75 miles (1.21 km) in its path through the Hattiesburg area and reached estimated maximum sustained winds of 170 mph (270 km/h) in Oak Grove neighborhood of West Hattiesburg. It destroyed many structures and impacted University of Southern Mississippi and two high schools (Oak Grove High School and Hattiesburg High School). Mississippi was declared a federal disaster area by President Barack Obama, and a state of emergency was issued by Mississippi Governor Phil Bryant.

== Meteorological synopsis ==
The Storm Prediction Center (SPC) had stated as early as February 8 that a few supercells would possibly develop on the 10th and could produce large hail, damaging winds, and a few tornadoes. When the thunderstorm outlook was issued for the 10th, the SPC stated that only a marginal chance for severe thunderstorms existed and that only a few storms would develop. Most of the severe weather activity was expected to develop along the cold front in the form of a squall line. A 10% chance of isolated tornadoes was introduced as the instability remained marginal for the event.

During the morning hours of February 10, a squall line developed along a cold front that stretched from western Arkansas, down through northwest Louisiana, and into east Texas. Simultaneously, a warm front was ascending northward through Mississippi and Louisiana. The area between the fronts became increasingly unstable as the day went on, and four tornado watches were issued across Texas, Louisiana, Mississippi, and Alabama throughout the day as the storms tracked eastward. The watches were issued as very strong wind shear and instability engrossed the area, causing the development of supercell thunderstorms. These watches were issued through the day, with the first being posted at 7 a.m. CST (1300 UTC) and the last one coming out at 5:35 p.m. CST (2335 UTC).

Throughout the afternoon hours, the cold front and the squall line began to stall over portions of Louisiana and Arkansas. The supercells that developed that afternoon ahead of the squall line originated across Louisiana and southern Mississippi. Around 4 p.m. (2200 UTC), a newly developed supercell produced an EF2 tornado in Marion County, Mississippi. That tornado tracked northeast and entered Lamar County, where it dissipated. Later, that same supercell quickly produced another tornado – this was a large wedge tornado that hit the Hattiesburg area.

== Tornado summary ==
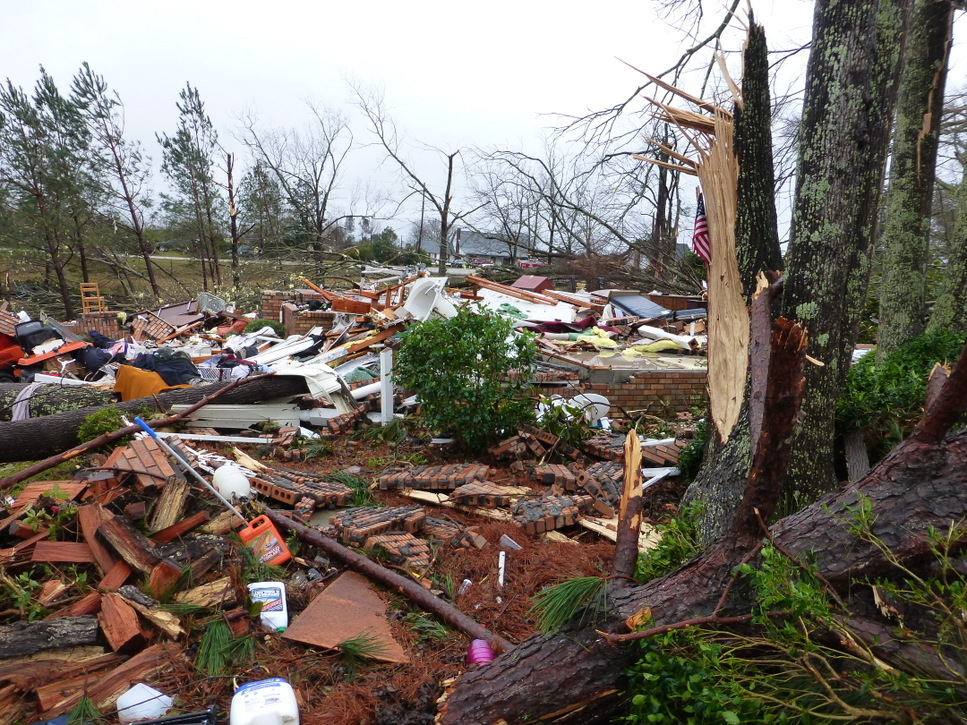
EF4 damage to a house near Oak Grove High School.

The tornado touched down west-southwest of West Hattiesburg at around 5:03 p.m. CST (23:03 UTC), causing EF0 damage to tree limbs at the western edge of the community. It rapidly widened and intensified as it moved through residential subdivisions of the city, snapping numerous trees and power lines, severely damaging homes, and expanding to one half-mile wide. Further northeast, it narrowed as it struck Oak Grove High School, causing major damage to the school's athletic complex. Several well-constructed buildings around the school's athletic stadiums were destroyed, with twisting and buckling steel girders noted. Several steel light poles with concrete reinforcement were snapped as well. Vehicles were thrown in considerable distances, one of which was taken from a parking lot of the high school, rolled up a hill and across the baseball field, and then deposited onto the pitcher's mound. Much of the damage in this area ranged from EF2 to EF3 intensity, though an isolated pocket of EF4 damage occurred just to the southwest of the high school, as a well-built brick home was completely flattened with debris scattered downwind. Nearby trees were denuded and debarked. As it then approached I-59, the tornado heavily damaged numerous homes and apartment buildings at EF2 to EF3 strength, and snapped more trees and power lines. It crossed the interstate and entered Forrest County, tearing through densely populated areas of Hattiesburg, resulting in major damage.

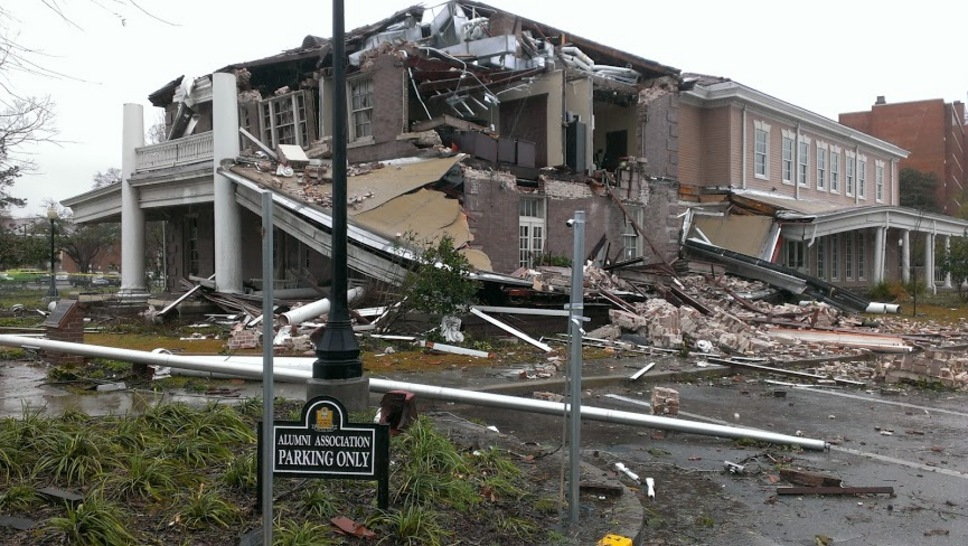
Damage to alumni housing on the University of Southern Mississippi campus.

In Forrest County, roughly 300 homes and other structures were damaged/destroyed as the tornado moved through various neighborhoods and business districts. The University of Southern Mississippi sustained significant damage to the southern portion of its campus; at least six buildings were damaged, and two others were destroyed there. Near the university, a gas station, a strip mall, a church, an apartment building, and multiple homes were damaged/destroyed, and some metal traffic light poles were mangled. The tornado continued through residential areas to the east of US 49, where many trees were uprooted, homes were heavily damaged, and a church's steeple was blown off. Large metal light poles at the athletic fields of Hattiesburg High School were snapped, and the third base wall at the baseball field was destroyed. The gymnasium sustained considerable damage to its roof as well. Near the high school, the American Red Cross Building lost its roof and some of its exterior walls, and the Girl Scouts of Greater Mississippi building had its roof torn off as well. The tornado then impacted the northern fringes of downtown Hattiesburg, damaging or destroying several more homes, snapping numerous power lines, and causing heavy damage to several large brick buildings, three of which were leveled. Damage intensity throughout the city of Hattiesburg ranged from EF2 to EF3. The tornado maintained its strength as it continued into Petal, where an ACE Hardware store was completely leveled and more homes were damaged or destroyed.

Traveling to the northeast of Petal, the tornado began to weaken, causing EF1 to EF2 strength damage to numerous roofs and downing many trees. It weakened to EF1-strength in Perry County before weakening rapidly and lifting in a wooded area just west of Runnelstown at 5:36 p.m. CST (2336 UTC).

The tornado was on the ground for 33 minutes, traveled 22.5 miles (36.2 km), had a maximum path width of 0.75 miles (1.21 km), and was rated low-end EF4, with winds up to 170 mph (270 km/h). It damaged many buildings and athletic fields at University of Southern Mississippi, Oak Grove High School, and Hattiesburg High School. In Lamar County (where the tornado first touched down and was rated EF4), 51 homes were destroyed and another 170 suffered major damage. The tornado was slightly weaker in Forrest County (EF3); however, 192 homes were destroyed and 338 suffered major damage. The tornado injured 71 people (8 in Lamar County and 63 in Forrest County) and caused damage amounting to $38.525 million.

This was the first violent tornado to occur in Lamar and Forrest Counties since April 24, 1908, in which 143 people were killed. 64 deaths occurred in Lamar and Forrest Counties alone with that tornado.

=== Other tornadoes ===
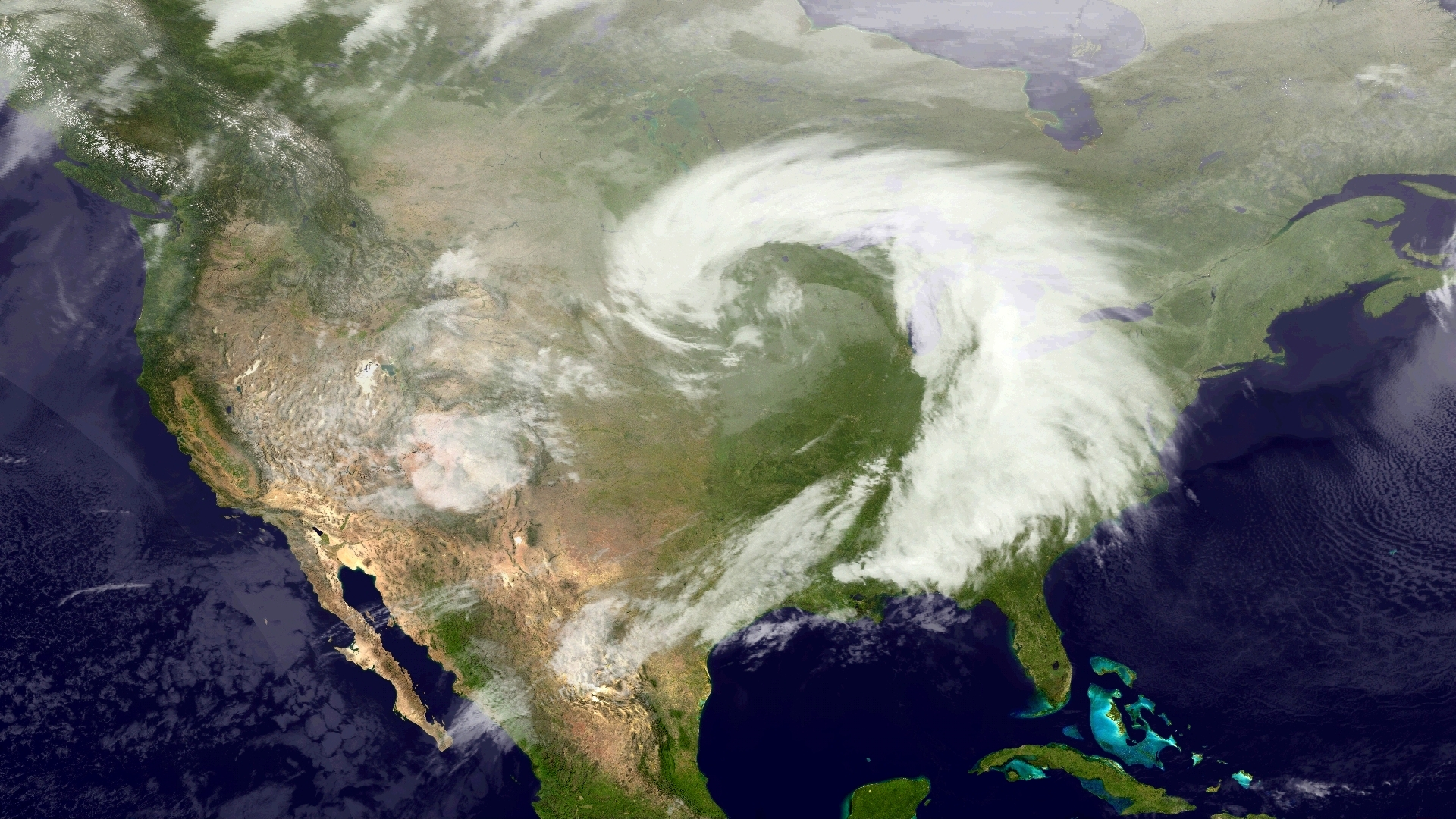
The storm system on February 10

Confirmed tornadoes by Enhanced Fujita rating
EFU	EF0	EF1	EF2	EF3	EF4	EF5	Total
0	1	5	1	0	1	0	8

=== February 10 event ===
List of confirmed tornadoes – Sunday, February 10, 2013 (Note: All dates are based on the local time zone where the tornado touched down; however, all times are in Coordinated Universal Time for consistency.)
EF#	Location	County / Parish	State	Start Coord.	Time (UTC)	Path length	Max width	Summary
EF0	E of Livingston	Polk	TX	30.707°N 94.871°W	15:15–15:20	0.51 mi (0.82 km)	30 yd (27 m)	A trailer was thrown about 50 feet (15 m) and several large pine trees were downed. One person was injured.
EF1	NW of Oak Vale	Lawrence	MS	31.4728°N 90.0118°W	21:39–21:43	1.58 mi (2.54 km)	140 yd (130 m)	Three homes and several barns were damaged and the front porch was removed from a mobile home. Numerous trees and power lines were downed along the path.
EF2	SE of Kokomo to ESE of Columbia	Marion, Lamar	MS	31.1091°N 89.9209°W	22:23–22:50	18.13 mi (29.18 km)	400 yd (370 m)	The tornado touched down just inside western Marion County and destroyed a few outbuildings. The tornado intensified and caused considerable damage in the Pickwick area. A home lost part of its roof and three mobile homes were destroyed as well. The tornado continued northeast and caused roof damage to three more homes. Many trees were downed in this area. The tornado then weakened but continued damaging structures and downing trees until it crossed into Lamar County. In Lamar County, a few other structures were damaged, including one home that lost its roof. Significant tree damage was noted and several power poles were snapped. Three people were injured. The storm later spawned the EF4 Hattiesburg tornado.
EF1	NW of Jackson	Washington, Clarke	AL	31.5446°N 88.1577°W	23:00–23:19	14.25 mi (22.93 km)	200 yd (180 m)	A few homes suffered roof damage and many trees were downed in Washington County. The tornado crossed the Tombigbee River into Clarke County, where it damaged three wood-frame homes, rolled a single-wide mobile home, and blew another mobile home off of its block foundation. Several pine trees were snapped before the tornado dissipated.
EF4	WSW of Hattiesburg to E of Petal	Lamar, Forrest, Perry	MS	31.2802°N 89.4665°W	23:03–23:36	21.65 mi (34.84 km)	1,320 yd (1,210 m)	See above section on this tornado – 71 people were injured.
EF1	NNE of Jackson	Clarke	AL	31.6208°N 87.8536°W	23:26–23:27	0.91 mi (1.46 km)	80 yd (73 m)	The roof of a shed was peeled back and several pine trees were snapped.
EF1	SSW of Waynesboro	Wayne	MS	31.533°N 88.6654°W	00:46–01:06	3.15 mi (5.07 km)	250 yd (230 m)	A few homes, outbuildings, and a barn suffered varying degrees of damage and many trees, mostly pine, were downed. The tornado came from the same supercell as the Hattiesburg tornado.
EF1	SE of Waynesboro	Wayne	MS	31.6263°N 88.5408°W	01:14–01:20	3.11 mi (5.01 km)	200 yd (180 m)	A single-wide mobile home was destroyed, several homes suffered roof damage, and many trees were downed. This tornado came from the same supercell that produced the Hattiesburg and Clara tornadoes.

== Aftermath ==
President Barack Obama declared Mississippi a federal disaster area following the tornado. Mississippi Governor Phil Bryant issued a State of emergency for Forrest, Lamar, Lawrence, and Marion Counties due to the impact of the severe storms and tornadoes in those counties.

Rain hampered cleanup efforts in the city during the days following the tornado. Schools remained closed in the Hattiesburg area until February 14, 2013, including the University of Southern Mississippi (USM). When schools reopened, school buses had to be borrowed from neighboring school districts as most of Hattiesburg's had been damaged by the tornado. USM had to move classes that were previously held in the eight damaged buildings. USM officials estimated that it would take over 10 million dollars to repair the school. Oak Grove High School in West Hattiesburg lost its athletic facilities as well as a few other buildings. The Lamar County School Superintendent said that it would take months and millions of dollars to repair. Hattiesburg High School also suffered destruction of some of its athletic facilities, including the basketball gym that had undergone renovations just a few weeks before.

Sempra U.S. Gas & Power donated $100,000 to Hattiesburg area schools and the American Red Cross branch based in Hattiesburg.

In the early morning hours of January 21, 2017, a destructive EF3 tornado destroyed many homes and businesses in Hattiesburg and Petal. This tornado was not as powerful as the 2013 event, though it resulted in four fatalities and many injuries.

== See also ==
- Weather of 2013
- List of North American tornadoes and tornado outbreaks
- List of F4 and EF4 tornadoes
  - List of F4 and EF4 tornadoes (2010–2019)
- Tornado outbreak of January 21–23, 2017 – A deadly EF3 tornado followed a similar path to this tornado four years later.
