= Nobody Loves an Albatross =

1953 play by Ronald Alexander

- Written by: Ronald Alexander
- Original language: English
- Genre: comedy play

Premiere
- Date premiered: December 19, 1963
- Place premiered: the Lyceum Theatre, New York City.

Nobody Loves an Albatross is a 1963 comedy play written by Ronald Alexander, which was performed at the Lyceum Theatre of Broadway, New York between 19 December 1963 and June 20, 1964.

It was produced by Elliot Martin and Philip Rose, directed by Gene Saks, scenery and lighting were by Will Steven Armstrong, costume design by Florence Klotz. The play, set in the "living room of Nathaniel Bentley's house in Beverly Hills", is a satire of the US television industry. It featured Robert Preston in the lead role.

== Cast ==
- Robert Preston as Nat Bentley
- Jack Bittner as Sean O'Loughlin
- Frank Campanella as L. T. Whitman
- Constance Ford as Hildy Jones
- Barnard Hughes as Bert Howell
- Leslye Hunter as Diane Bentley
- Leon Janney as Mike Harper
- Gertrude Jeannette as Sarah Washington
- Phil Leeds as Victor Talsey
- Richard Mulligan as Phil Matthews
- Carol Rossen as Jean Hart
- Marie Wallace as Linda
- Marian Winters as Marge Weber

== In popular culture ==
In Rosemary's Baby, Rosemary's husband Guy Woodhouse is said to have appeared in this play.
