= Tornado outbreak of January 21–23, 2017 =

Tornado outbreak in the Southeastern United States

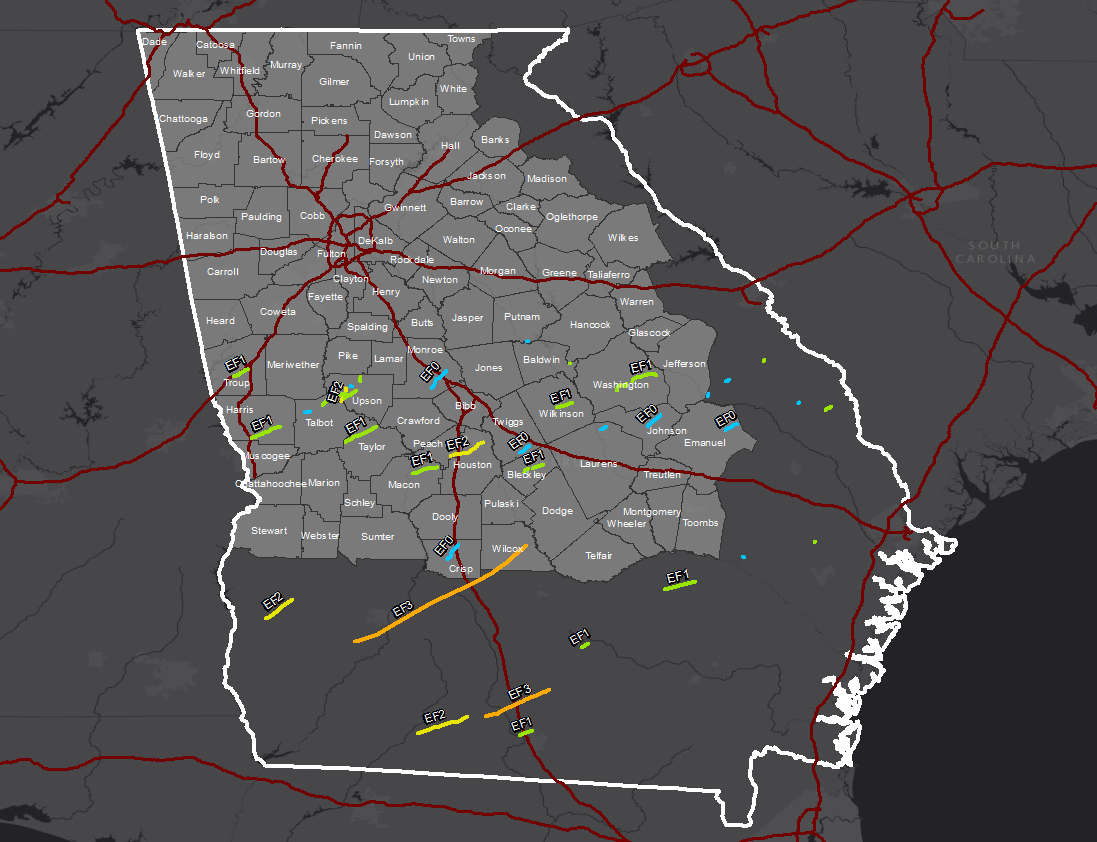
- Tracks of the record-breaking 42 tornadoes that touched down across Georgia on January 21–22

Meteorological history
- Duration: January 21–23, 2017

Tornado outbreak
- Tornadoes: 81 confirmed (Second-highest for a January outbreak)
- Max. rating: EF3 tornado
- Duration: 1 day, 23 hours, and 13 minutes
- Highest winds: Tornadic – 150 mph (240 km/h) (Albany, GA EF3 on January 22)
- Highest gusts: Non-tornadic – 75 mph (121 km/h) at Birmingham Airport, Alabama
- Largest hail: 3–3.5 in (7.6–8.9 cm) diameter near Jonesville, Louisiana

Nor'easter
- Max. snowfall: Snow – 9.5 in (24 cm) near Saint-Pamphile, Quebec; Ice – 0.5 in (13 mm) near Jonesboro, Maine

Overall effects
- Fatalities: 20 fatalities (+2 non-tornadic)
- Injuries: 204 injuries
- Damage: $1.3 billion (2017 USD)
- Areas affected: Southeastern United States, Northeast, Canada (Quebec)
- Part of the tornado outbreaks of 2017 and the 2016–17 North American winter

A prolific and deadly winter tornado outbreak struck areas across the Southeast United States between January 21–23, 2017. Lasting just under two days, the outbreak produced a total of 81 tornadoes, cementing its status as the second-largest January tornado outbreak and the third-largest winter tornado outbreak since 1950. Furthermore, it was the largest outbreak on record in Georgia with 42 tornadoes confirmed in the state. The most significant tornadoes were three EF3 tornadoes that heavily damaged or destroyed portions of Hattiesburg, Mississippi, and Albany and Adel, Georgia. A total of 20 people were killed by tornadoes—mainly during the pre-dawn hours of the outbreak—making it the second-deadliest outbreak in January since 1950, behind the 1969 Hazlehurst, Mississippi tornado outbreak that killed 32 people. In addition, the tornado death toll was higher than the entire previous year. In the aftermath of the outbreak, relief organizations assisted in clean-up and aid distribution. Total economic losses from the event reached at least $1.3 billion (2017 USD).

Non-tornadic impacts were also felt along the East Coast of the United States. Straight-line winds in Lake City, Florida killed one person when a tree fell on their home. The extratropical cyclone morphed into a nor'easter as it moved across the Northeast United States and Canada, producing a combination of rain and wintry precipitation, as well as strong winds. One death occurred in northern Philadelphia, Pennsylvania after flying debris struck an elderly man. Thousands of residents were left without power, and significant beach erosion was observed along the New Jersey coastline. Maximum snowfall reached nearly 10 inches (25 cm) in the hardest hit by the wintry side, mainly near southern Canada and near Quebec.

== Meteorological synopsis ==
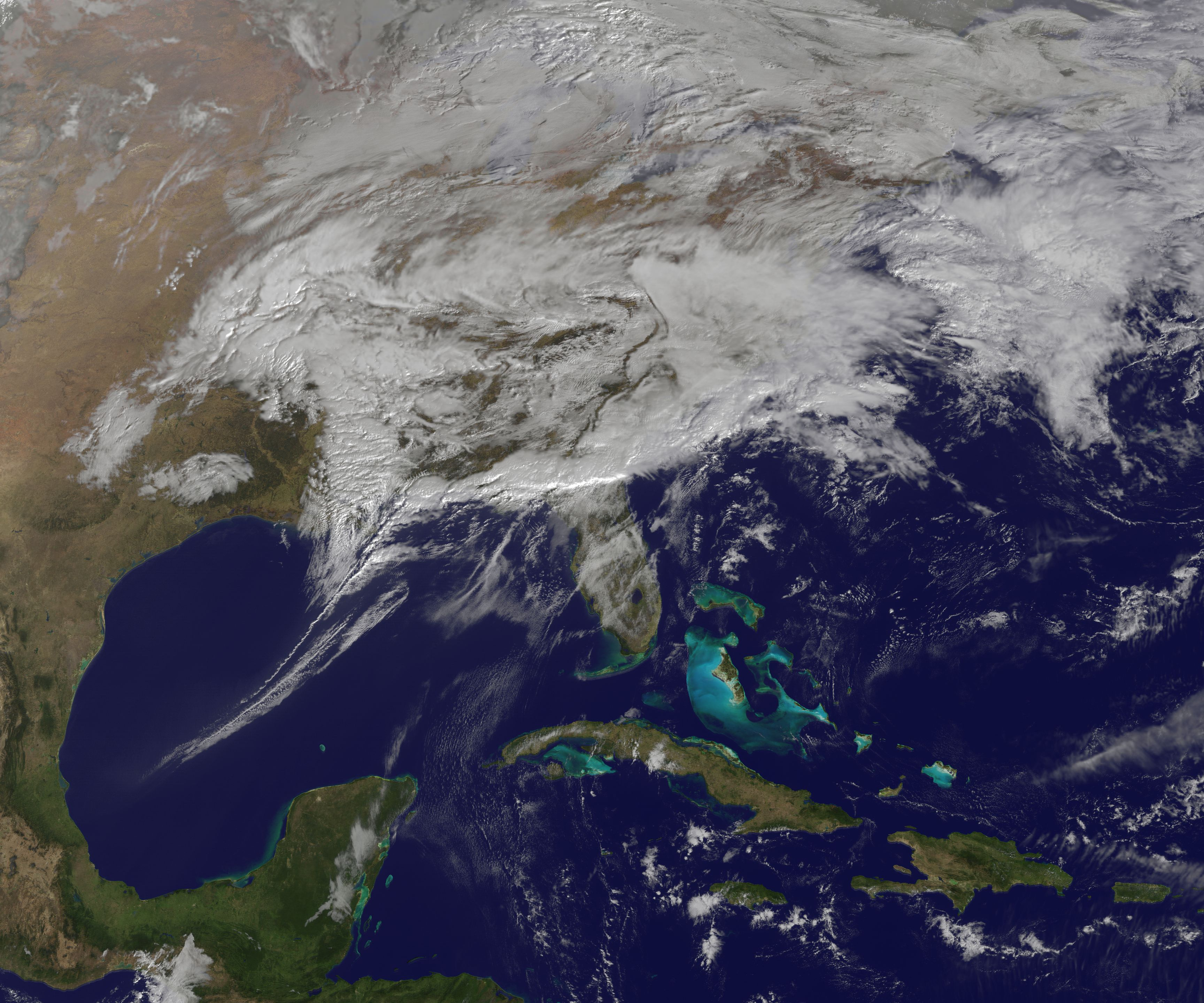
GOES-13 satellite imagery of the storm complex that produced the tornado outbreak on January 22

=== January 21 ===
On January 17, 2017, the Storm Prediction Center (SPC) noted the potential for a high-end severe weather event to occur in the Southern United States on January 21 and 22. On January 20, a large-scale, negatively tilted (aligned northwest to southeast) trough moved from the Western United States over the Great Plains, Broad cyclonic flow soon became established over much of the United States, with multiple shortwave troughs embedded within. Persistent convection from the Texas coastline to Mississippi initially inhibited the northward flow of warm, moist air and by extension limited proliferation of severe thunderstorms. Later in the day, a warm front—separating moisture-rich Gulf air and modified continental-polar air—developed over the southern Mississippi Valley within an environment of steep lapse rates and modest wind shear; this became the focal point for potentially tornadic storms. A low-level jet subsequently developed along the coast of Texas and Louisiana that evening, and thunderstorm clusters blossomed along the frontal boundary. At 7:20 p.m. CST (01:20 UTC, January 21), a tornado watch was issued for extreme eastern Texas and southwestern Louisiana, supplemented by another watch extending into southern Mississippi by 11:00 p.m. CST (05:00 UTC, January 21).

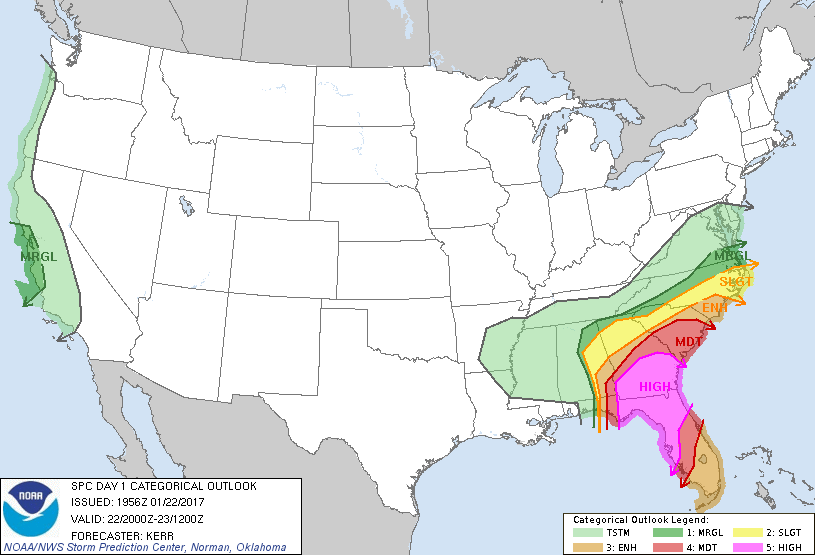
The SPC's convective outlook for January 22

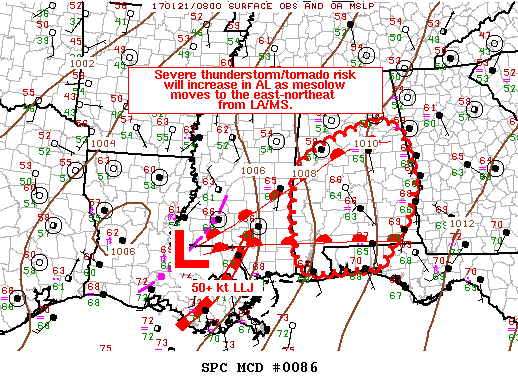
Surface analysis by the SPC at 2:00 a.m. CST (08:00 UTC) depicting the mesoscale low over Louisiana and its warm front extending east

In the pre-dawn hours of January 21, a mesoscale low consolidated near Baton Rouge, Louisiana, at the western edge of the previously established warm front. This led to enhanced low-level southerly flow over Mississippi and an increased risk of supercells embedded within the broader thunderstorm complex. One of the embedded cells produced an EF3 tornado around 3:35 a.m. CST (09:35 UTC) that traveled through Lamar and Forrest counties in Mississippi. After sunrise, severe storms and tornadoes continued further to the east, and the Storm Prediction Center later issued a moderate risk for parts of Arkansas, Louisiana, and Mississippi, along with an enhanced risk for parts of Alabama, Georgia, South Carolina, and Florida. This included a 10% risk area for tornadoes, and numerous tornadoes touched down across the threat area, several of which were strong and caused significant damage. During the early morning hours of January 22, a deadly EF3 tornado produced devastating damage and obliterated a mobile home park near Adel, Georgia, killing 11 people along its path. Numerous other people were injured in the state because of the storms.

=== January 22 ===
After sunrise, the Storm Prediction Center issued a high risk for a major severe weather and tornado outbreak across central Florida and southeastern Georgia, including a 30% risk area for tornadoes. Strong, long-track tornadoes were expected in the threat area, and it was the first time a high risk was issued since June 3, 2014. In Florida and Georgia, a Particularly Dangerous Situation tornado watch was issued. Meteorologists at the Jacksonville, Florida branch of the National Weather Service stated that the event "had the potential to be one of the most severe weather outbreaks since the 1993 super storm" for northeastern Florida and southeastern Georgia. Later that day, a massive EF3 wedge tornado caused severe damage in and around Albany, Georgia, killing five people and destroying many homes and businesses. A few weak tornadoes occurred in Florida during the early morning hours of January 23 before the outbreak came to an end.

== Confirmed tornadoes ==
Confirmed tornadoes by Enhanced Fujita rating
EFU	EF0	EF1	EF2	EF3	EF4	EF5	Total
0	23	44	11	3	0	0	81

With 81 tornadoes touching down, the outbreak ranks as the second-largest January outbreak since records began in 1950, second only to the tornado outbreak of January 21–23, 1999 (during which 129 tornadoes touched down). It also ranks as the fourth-largest winter outbreak, just behind the 2008 Super Tuesday outbreak which produced 86 tornadoes, as well as behind the December 2021 Midwest derecho and tornado outbreak, which produced 120 tornadoes. More than half of the tornadoes occurred in Georgia. With 42 confirmed in the state, the outbreak ranks as the largest on record for Georgia, surpassing the previous highest of 25 during the Hurricane Ivan tornado outbreak in 2004. Of the 42 tornadoes, 27 touched down within the county warning area of the Atlanta National Weather Service Office, the most for a two-day period. This surpassed the previous highest of 16 during the Hurricane Katrina tornado outbreak in 2005. Additionally, it shattered the record for January tornadoes in the state, bringing the monthly total to 52; the previous monthly record was just 15 in 1972. Furthermore, the 20 fatalities ranks the outbreak as the deadliest in January since 1969.

=== Hattiesburg–Petal, Mississippi ===
Hattiesburg–Petal, Mississippi
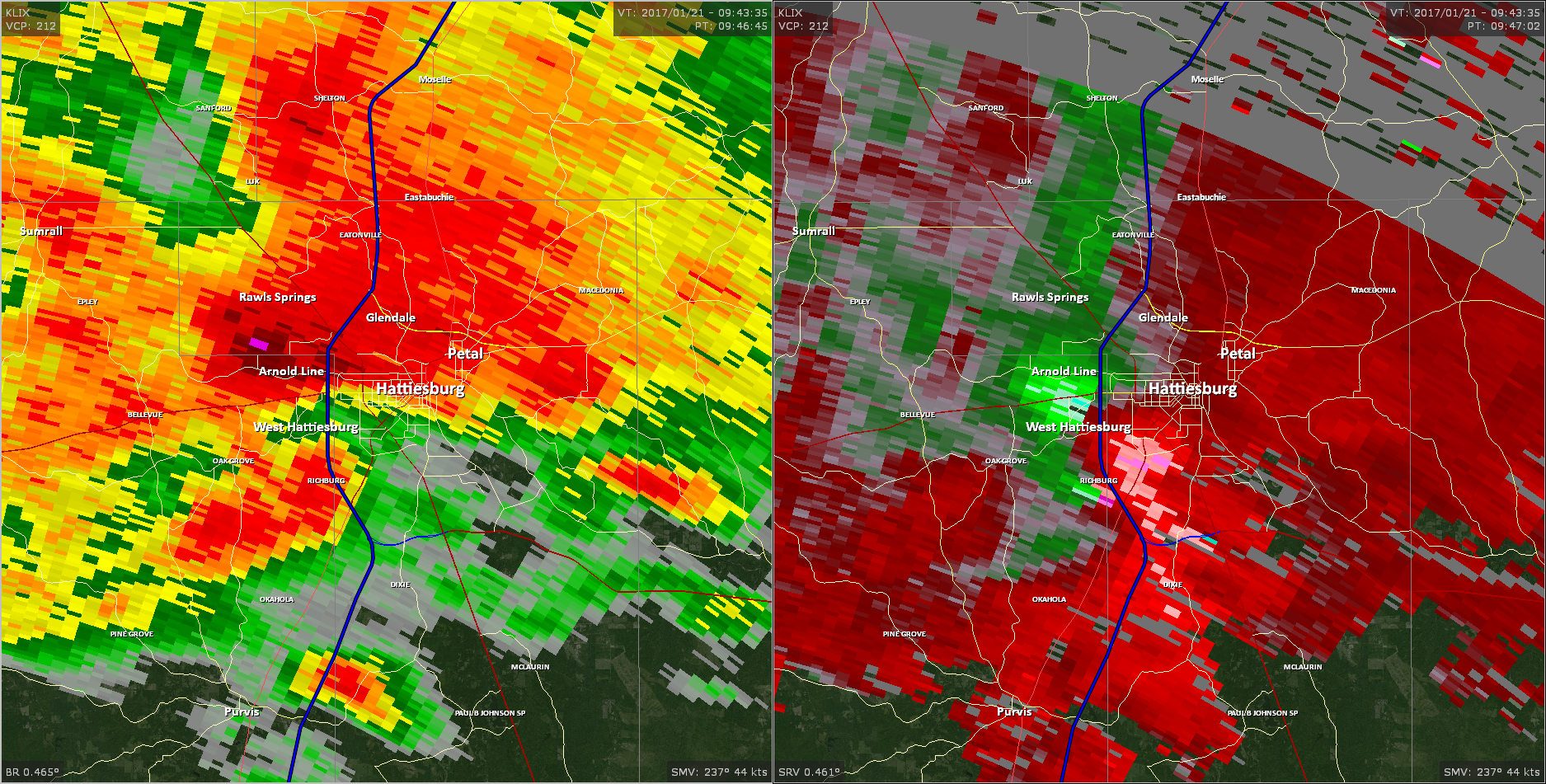
- Doppler radar scan of the EF3 tornado as it was striking Hattiesburg.

Meteorological history
- Formed: January 21, 2017, 3:35 a.m. CST (UTC−06:00)
- Dissipated: January 21, 2017, 4:13 a.m. CST (UTC−06:00)
- Duration: 38 minutes

EF3 tornado
- on the Enhanced Fujita scale
- Highest winds: 145 mph (233 km/h)

Overall effects
- Fatalities: 4
- Injuries: 57
- Damage: $9.46 million (2017 USD)

Early in the morning on January 21, a large tornado touched down northwest of Purvis in Lamar County, Mississippi, at 3:35 a.m. EST (08:35 UTC). The tornado initially caused EF1 damage, snapping and uprooting many trees and destroying small sheds. A house sustained minor roof damage and collapse of its carport, and a power pole was snapped as well. Further to the northeast, the tornado reached EF2 intensity as it ripped the roof off of a well-built brick home and destroyed outbuildings. As the tornado approached the Forrest County line, EF2 damage continued as another home had its roof torn off, a mobile home was completely destroyed, and a billboard pole was snapped. Other homes in this area sustained minor roof damage, and trees and power poles were downed. The tornado intensified to EF3 strength shortly after it crossed the Forrest County line and entered residential areas of southwestern Hattiesburg, where multiple well-constructed brick homes had roofs torn off and exterior walls collapsed, and an elderly woman was killed. The tornado continued producing EF3 damage as it crossed Veterans Memorial Drive, snapping metal power pylons and severely damaging two buildings at Living Word Church. Maintaining its strength, the tornado moved across US 49 and through a residential area, damaging several homes and destroying the top floor of a church. The tornado then tore directly through the William Carey University campus, resulting in severe structural damage and tossing and damaging numerous vehicles in the parking lots. Multiple large, multi-story brick buildings had windows blown out, roofs ripped off, and top floor exterior walls collapsed. Light poles were downed at the ball field as well.

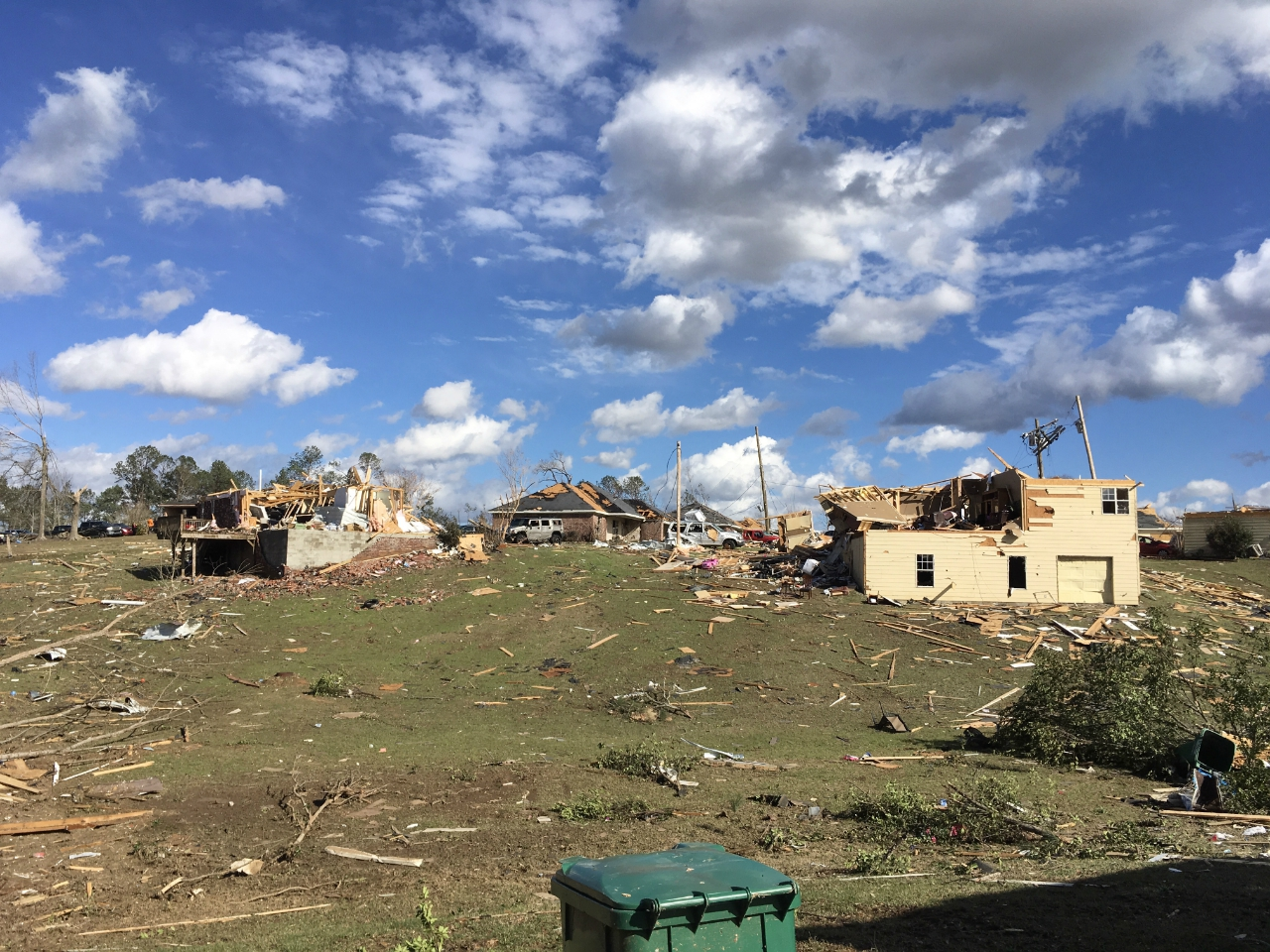
Multiple homes destroyed at EF3 intensity in the eastern part of Petal.

Past William Carey University, the tornado weakened to EF2 strength as it moved through residential areas and a mobile home park to the southeast of downtown Hattiesburg. Many large trees were downed, some of which landed on and completely crushed sections of frame homes and mobile homes, resulting in three fatalities in this area. Several other frame homes had roofs and walls ripped off, a fire station was damaged, and a church lost large sections of its roof as well. The tornado then entered Petal, destroying large commercial sheds, damaging roofs and collapsing cinder block walls at several businesses, snapping many trees and power poles, and tearing large sections of roofing from homes. As the tornado impacted the eastern part of Petal, it restrengthened to EF3 intensity as multiple well-built frame homes were destroyed, some of which only had a few walls left standing. Other homes, a church, and a strip mall in this area were heavily damaged at EF2 strength as well. The tornado maintained EF3 strength as it continued to the northeast outside of Petal, toppling two metal truss towers to the ground. A brick frame home in this area was completely leveled after a nearby mobile home was thrown into it. Beyond this point, the tornado weakened back to EF2 strength as it approached the Perry County line, snapping and uprooting numerous large trees. After crossing into Perry County, the tornado damaged or destroyed several outbuildings and mobile homes, snapped and uprooted numerous trees, ripped the roof off of a frame home, and caused minor damage to several other homes near Runnelstown before dissipating. Damage intensity along this final portion of the path ranged from EF1 to EF2. Four people were killed by this tornado along its 31.3 mi (50.4 km) long path, and 57 others were injured.

Hattiesburg and Petal had previously sustained major damage from an EF4 tornado that struck on February 10, 2013. However, damage from the 2017 tornado was more severe in Petal. Following the tornado, members of the Jackson Salvation Army were sent to Hattiesburg to provide assistance. Volunteers traveled from across the nation to assist with cleanup efforts, some of whom also provided assistance after the 2013 tornado.

=== Barney–Adel–Nashville, Georgia ===
Barney–Adel–Nashville, Georgia
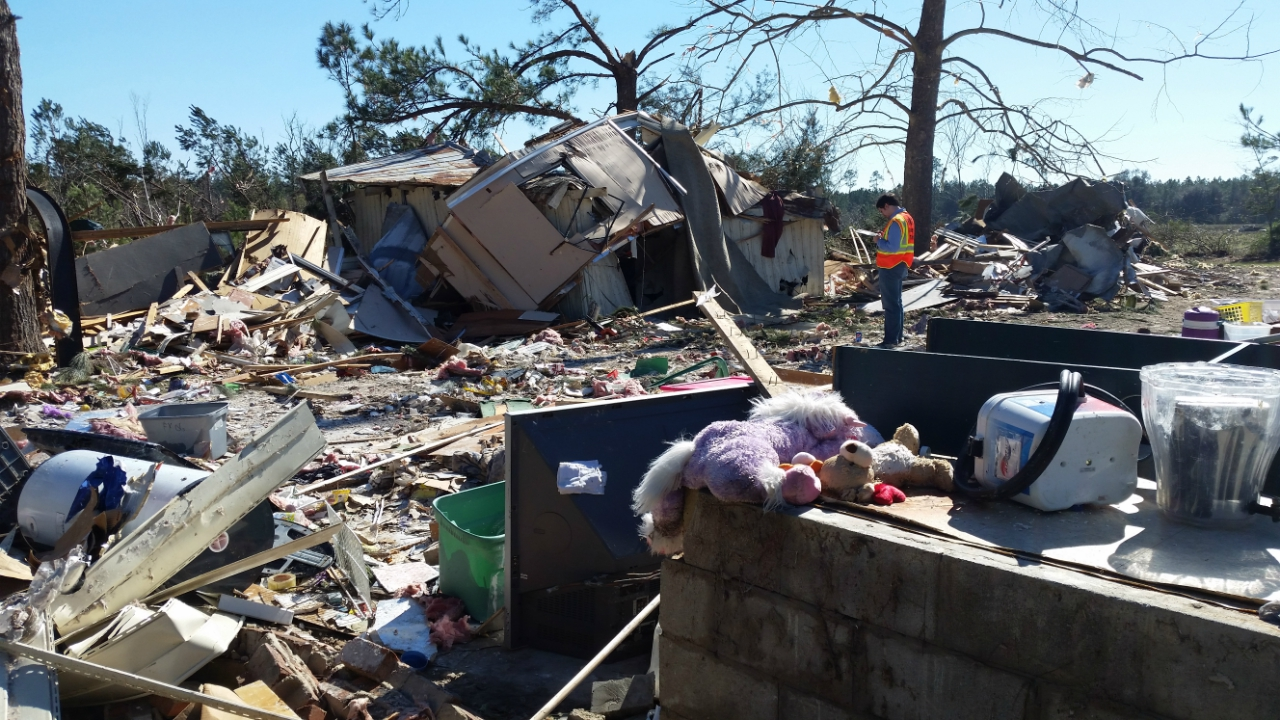
- A double-wide mobile home destroyed by the tornado in southwestern Berrien County.

Meteorological history
- Date: January 22, 2017
- Formed: January 22, 2017; 3:29 a.m. CST (UTC–06:00)
- Dissipated: January 22, 2017; 3:58 a.m. CST (UTC–06:00)
- Duration: 29 minutes

EF3 tornado
- on the Enhanced Fujita scale
- Highest winds: 140 mph (230 km/h)

Overall effects
- Fatalities: 11
- Injuries: 45
- Damage: $2.5 million (2017 USD)

Around 3:29 a.m. EST (08:29 UTC) on January 22, what was to become a deadly and destructive tornado first touched down along SR 122 to the west-southwest of Barney in Brooks County, Georgia at EF1 intensity. Tracking east-northeast, the tornado snapped or uprooted multiple trees and shifted a barn off of its foundation before it quickly intensified to low-end EF3 strength. A business in this area had two of its concrete exterior walls blown out. A strapped-down mobile home was tossed about 100 ft (30 m) and destroyed on impact, killing two occupants. A third of the second story of a well-built brick house was ripped off, and a wood-framed home was shifted about 12 ft (3.7 m) off its foundation. Debarking of trees occurred in this area as well. As the tornado passed just north of Barney, it abruptly turned northeast before entering Cook County.

Maintaining low-end EF3 intensity, the tornado passed just south of Adel and struck the Sunshine Acres mobile home park, causing tremendous damage. Of the park's roughly 100 homes, 45 were destroyed—35 of which were obliterated—with debris swept into piles along the south end of the development. Seven fatalities took place in Sunshine Acres. A survivor reported seeing a girl thrown into a ditch and a mother and son crushed underneath their home when it was thrown on top of them. A brick home had most of its second floor removed and two first floor exterior walls collapsed. Another home built of concrete blocks was destroyed, and a nearby farm had several concrete anchors for a large metal structure ripped from the ground. After entering Berrien County, low-end EF3 damage continued as another wood-framed home lost most of its second floor, trees sustained debarking, a well-strapped-down mobile home was tossed into nearby trees, and most of the roof to a brick home was removed. An add-on to the brick home was crushed by a very large tree, killing two occupants. The tornado eventually dissipated around 3:58 a.m. EST (08:58 UTC) roughly 4 mi (6.4 km) southeast of Nashville after causing some EF2 damage near US 129.

Overall, the tornado killed 11 people along a 24.88 mi (40.04 km) track lasting 29 minutes. Following the tornado, Georgia State Patrol troopers blocked off access to the community, eventually allowing residents to return on January 24.

=== Albany–Ashburn–Rochelle, Georgia ===
Albany–Ashburn–Rochelle, Georgia
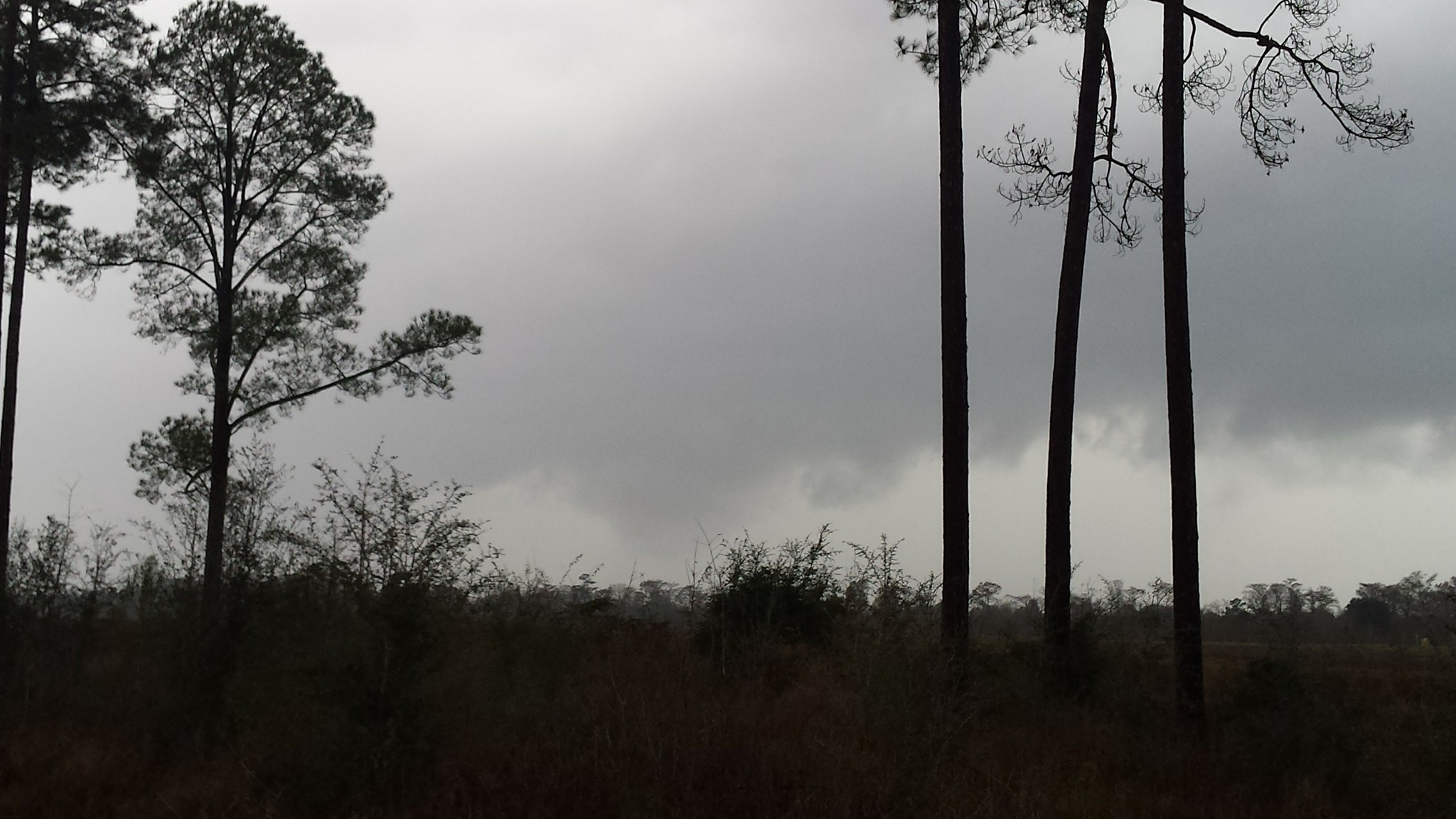
- Photo of the tornado developing in Baker County

Meteorological history
- Formed: January 22, 2017, 3:15 p.m. EST (UTC–05:00)
- Dissipated: January 22, 2017, 4:27 p.m. EST (UTC–05:00)
- Duration: 1 hour, 12 minutes

EF3 tornado
- on the Enhanced Fujita scale
- Highest winds: 150 mph (240 km/h)

Overall effects
- Fatalities: 5
- Injuries: 40
- Damage: $310 million (2017 USD)

The most intense and longest lived tornado of the outbreak was a massive, rain-wrapped wedge tornado that began in southern Dougherty County, Georgia during the late afternoon hours of January 22. At 3:15 p.m. EDT, the tornado touched down in Dougherty County. Shortly after beginning, the tornado strengthened to EF1 intensity, snapping multiple trees. It then crossed Tarva Lane, weakening back to EF0 intensity. Continuing east, the tornado uprooted a tree before shifting northeast, stilling uprooting trees. The tornado began rapidly intensifying to EF2 intensity and expanding to over 1.25 miles (2.01 kilometers) wide, north of Newton. Continuing at Mid-range EF2 intensity, it snapped multiple softwood trees along Newton Road. After remaining mostly rural, the tornado entered the southern portions of Albany. A group of homes had their exterior walls fail at low-end EF3 intensity. Continuing northeast at low-end EF3 intensity, it snapped multiple trees in its path. The tornado then crossed Moultrie Road, damaging a fast food restaurant. Moving over Mock Road, the tornado weakened back to EF2 intensity.

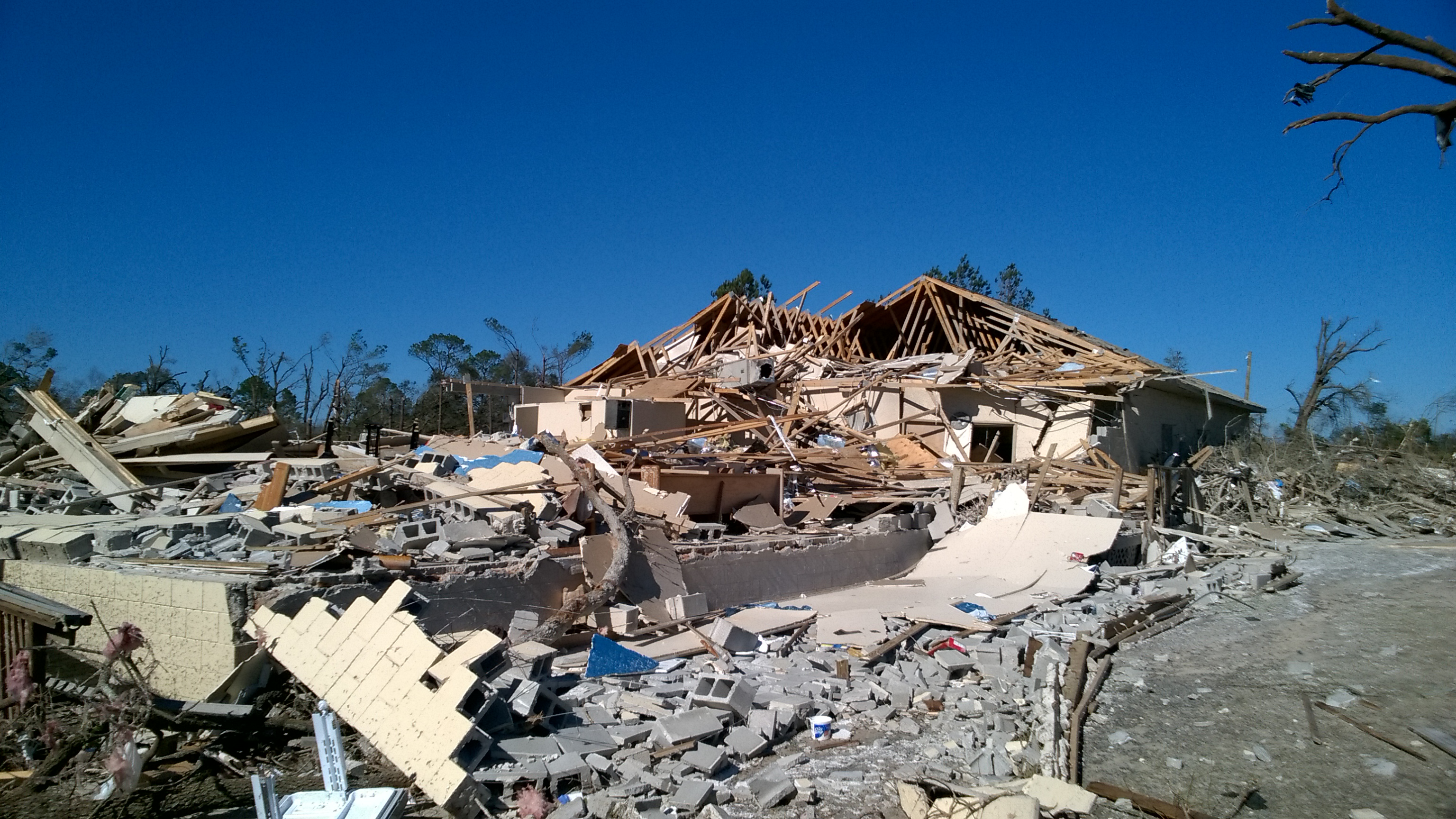
The Church in Albany subject to EF3 winds.

After weakening, one home had its roof removed at mid-range EF2 intensity. After impacting the home, the tornado entered Marine Corps property. Still on Marine property, the tornado intensified to EF3 intensity once again. Crossing Sylvester Road, the tornado severely damaged a well built, cement church that was anchored with rebar. The tornado remained at EF3 intensity, ripping the roof off of a home. The tornado blew away multiple mobile homes at low-end EF3 intensity on Harris Road. The tornado entered Worth County, maintaining EF3 intensity. After crossing into Worth County, the tornado remained mostly rural before impacting Jewel Crowe Road, where it destroyed multiple homes at low-end EF3 intensity. One hardwood tree nearby was snapped. Before traveling over Camp Osborn Road, it weakened to EF2 intensity, but still being able to snap trees. After snapping trees in rural areas between roads, the tornado destroyed a church. Continuing northeast, even more trees were snapped near Abrams Creek. Crossing the county line, the tornado went into Turner County.

Continuing into Turner County, the tornado moved in a straight line, pointing northeast. By the time it reached Turner County, the tornado had weakened to EF1 intensity, causing intense damage to trees. One wood framed home had been partially slid off the foundation in low-end EF3 intensity winds. The tornado weakened back to EF2 intensity, moving over Interstate 75. It passed south of Double Run before going into Wilcox County. The tornado intensified back to EF2 intensity, directly south of Highway 280. It impacted mobile home at high-end EF2 intensity, bending the mobile home’s undercarriage and separating it from the walls. Another mobile home northwest, on Mount Olive Road, had been blown away at high-end EF2 intensity. Hardwood trees nearby were uprooted. The tornado then rapidly weakened before lifting at 4:27 p.m. EDT.

In total, the tornado was on the ground for 70.73 miles (113.83 km) and 72 minutes. The damage path was very wide in some areas, at times expanding to 1.25 miles (2.01 km) in width. It killed five people—including an elderly woman who succumbed to head injuries days later—and injured over 40 others.

== Non-tornadic events ==
=== Windstorm (January 22) ===
In addition to the widespread damage from tornadoes, straight-line winds caused extensive damage in multiple states. One person was killed in Lake City, Florida, when a tree fell on their home. The Sunshine Skyway Bridge, crossing the mouth of Tampa Bay, was closed to all vehicles for several hours; at 5 p.m.; the Florida Highway Patrol stated that winds on the bridge averaged 43 to 52 miles per hour (69 to 84 km/h). At Orlando International Airport, wind gusts reached 54 mph (87 km/h). Two tornadoes and powerful straight-line winds left more than 100,000 customers without electricity in the Miami Metropolitan Area.

=== Nor'easter (January 23–24) ===
After January 22, the extratropical cyclone continued to move to the northeast, striking the mid-Atlantic and New England states, and the southeastern portions of Canada while transitioning into a nor'easter, causing high winds, rain, snow, and ice storms. The storms caused wind damage to various buildings, including at least one death, and shuttered several airports and other transportation systems as it passed. It also caused significant beach erosion in parts of New Jersey and flooded coastal communities in New Jersey and Long Island. On the 24th, wind gusts around the New York City metro area approached 60 mph (97 km/h). Rainfall totals in Central Park were 2.18 in (55 mm), and 2.05 in (52 mm) in Hudson County, New Jersey. There was a lane closure on I-195 in Massachusetts as a result of the nor'easter as well. One person was killed due to the nor'easter in Pennsylvania after they were struck by a car lot sign.

Freezing rain and snow caused treacherous traveling conditions across southern Quebec on January 24; at least 100 accidents were blamed on slippery roads.

== Aftermath ==
Following overnight tornadoes across Mississippi on January 21–22, Mississippi Governor Phil Bryant declared a state of emergency. Preliminary estimates for damage in Hattiesburg alone reached $200 million. The charity group Christian Services provided meals to 1,600 people in Hattiesburg on January 22. On January 25 President Donald Trump declared a major disaster for Mississippi, enabling the use of federal funding for victims in Forrest, Lamar, Lauderdale, and Perry counties.

President Trump offered his condolences and vowed to provide assistance to Georgia. Liaison officers from the Federal Emergency Management Agency were deployed to Alabama, Florida, Georgia, and Mississippi. The Red Cross began mobilizing relief efforts during the afternoon of January 22 in Georgia. Georgia Governor Nathan Deal declared a state of emergency in seven impacted counties and promised to provide the aid to affected areas. Georgia Lieutenant Governor Casey Cagle estimated damage across southwestern areas of the state at $400 million. President Trump declared a major disaster for Dougherty County on January 25, supplementing a prior declaration covering straight-line wind damage incurred on January 2 in Baker, Calhoun, Dougherty, Early, Mitchell, Turner, and Worth counties.

== See also ==
- 1998 Kissimmee tornado outbreak
- 2007 Groundhog Day tornado outbreak
- 2013 Hattiesburg, Mississippi tornado
- Tornado outbreak of February 28 – March 2, 2007
- Tornado outbreak of January 21–23, 1999
