= R. B. Sprague =

American painter

Roger Bruce Sprague
- R.B. Sprague. Melon, Bag, Window, 1999
- Born: September 12, 1937; Buffalo, New York
- Died: 28 July 2010 (aged 72); Santa Fe, NM
- Education: El Dorado High School, University of Oklahoma
- Known for: Painter, drawings
- Movement: Realist
- Awards: 1992 C. Howard Wilkins, Sr. Award, Wichita Art Association; 1962 Elmer Capshaw Award for Excellence in Graphics, He was honored as Artist in Residence at the University of Oklahoma in 2001

R. B. (Roger) Sprague (September 12, 1937 – July 28, 2010) was an American Contemporary Realist artist.

== Biography ==
Sprague was born in Buffalo, New York, and raised in south Arkansas, graduating from El Dorado High School. He attended the University of Oklahoma and graduated with a BA in Fine Arts, with majors in botany, architecture, and finally, in painting. Sprague resided in New York City and worked as booking agent and shipboard companion for United States Lines. He lived for a year on Swan's Island, Maine, where his father's family started life in the U.S. His conviction to make art his life and his living came to fruition in 1975 when he moved to New Mexico, working briefly in Bosque Farms in a plant nursery, then moving to a one-room arrangement in Santa Fe in 1979 where he dedicated his life to his art.

In 2010, Patricia Rovzar Gallery said:

R.B. Sprague is driven by his never-ending exploration of scale and light. Painting in oil on linen the majority of Sprague's work focuses on interior spaces and the relationships of the objects he places within those spaces. He defines his compositions with common objects like tables and chairs but always leaves ample room for the viewer to create their own interpretation.

In 1987, R.B. Sprague said in Southwest Art:

I paint what I see, and what attracts me is light and the geometry it illuminates. When I see light on a surface at a particular moment. I think it will follow me for the rest of my life.

== Exhibitions ==
- 1995 J. Cacciola Galleries NYC
- 1994 "Realists", Jay Fletcher Gallery Santa Fe, NM
- 1994 J. Cacciola Galleries NYC
- 1993 Fletcher Gallery Santa Fe, NM
- 1992 J. Cacciola Galleries NYC
- 1992 "Small Paintings", J. Cacciola Galleries NYC
- 1992 "Summer Invitational Exhibition", J. Cacciola Galleries NYC
- 1990 Santa Fe East Santa Fe, NM
- 1990 Western Images Gallery NYC
- 1989 Santa Fe East Santa Fe, NM
- 1988 Western Images Gallery NYC
- 1987 "New Mexico Old and New", Santa Fe East Santa Fe, NM
- 1987 "Santa Fe Opera Annual Holiday Invitational", Santa Fe, NM
- 1986 "Quiet Realities II", Santa Fe East Santa Fe, NM
- 1986 "Inspirations: Churches of New Mexico", Museum of Fine Arts Santa Fe, NM
- 1986 "Arts at First Plymouth Ninth Annual", Englewood, CO
- 1985 "Artists of Santa Fe", Oklahoma City, OK
- 1981 Robert Nichols Gallery Santa Fe, NM
- 1980 South Arkansas Art Center El Dorado, AR

=== Selected major collections ===
- Museum of Fine Art
- University of Oklahoma
