= Lawson, Arkansas =

- Census-designated place
- Location within Arkansas Location within the United States
- Coordinates: 33°12′01″N 92°29′40″W
- Country: United States
- State: Arkansas
- County: Union
- Elevation: 213 ft (65 m)

Population (2020)
  - Total: 260
- Time zone: UTC-6 (Central (CST))
  - Summer (DST): UTC-5 (CDT)
- ZIP code: 71750
- Area code: 870
- GNIS feature ID: 2805659

Lawson is an unincorporated community and census-designated place (CDP) in Union County, Arkansas, United States. Lawson was founded by Lawson Smith, who was born in 1813 and died in 1899. Lawson is located on Arkansas Highway 129, 10.5 miles (16.9 km) east of El Dorado. Lawson has a post office with ZIP code 71750. It was first listed as a CDP in the 2020 census with a population of 260.

== Education ==
It is in the El Dorado School District. The district operates El Dorado High School.

In 1978 the Lawson and Urbana school districts merged into the El Dorado district.

== Demographics ==
Historical population
Census	Pop.	Note	%±
2020	260		—
U.S. Decennial Census; 2020

=== 2020 census ===
Lawson CDP, Arkansas – Demographic Profile (NH = Non-Hispanic) Note: the US Census treats Hispanic/Latino as an ethnic category. This table excludes Latinos from the racial categories and assigns them to a separate category. Hispanics/Latinos may be of any race.
Race / Ethnicity	Pop 2020	% 2020
White alone (NH)	233	89.62%
Black or African American alone (NH)	3	1.15%
Native American or Alaska Native alone (NH)	0	0.00%
Asian alone (NH)	1	0.38%
Pacific Islander alone (NH)	2	0.77%
Some Other Race alone (NH)	1	0.38%
Mixed Race/Multi-Racial (NH)	13	8.03%
Hispanic or Latino (any race)	5	5.00%
Total	260	100.00%
