= Buster Raborn =

American football center and linebacker

No. 16, 13
- Positions: Center; Linebacker

Personal information
- Born: March 28, 1913; El Dorado, Arkansas, U.S.
- Died: December 21, 1991 (aged 78); Fortuna, California, U.S.

Career information
- High school: El Dorado
- College: SMU (1932–1935)

Career history
- Pittsburgh Pirates (1936–1937)

Carroll Martin Raborn (March 28, 1913 – December 21, 1991), known professionally as Buster Raborn, was an American professional football center and linebacker. He played for the Pittsburgh Pirates of the National Football League (NFL).

== Life and career ==
Raborn was born in El Dorado, Arkansas. He played high school football at El Dorado High School. He then enrolled at Southern Methodist University to play college football for the SMU Mustangs. He was on the freshman team in 1932, and was a two-year varsity letterman from 1934 to 1935.

In 1936, Raborn joined the Pittsburgh Pirates of the National Football League. He played in twelve games during the 1936 NFL season, and played in eleven games during the 1937 NFL season. He became a free agent on August 1, 1938. Aside from his football career, he worked as a crooner.

== Death ==
Raborn died on December 21, 1991 in Fortuna, California, at the age of 78.
