= El Dorado School District (Arkansas) =

School district in Arkansas, United States

Location
- 200 West Oak Street; El Dorado, Arkansas 71730 United States

District information
- Motto: Keeping The Promise: Teaching and Learning for All
- Grades: PK–12
- Accreditation: AdvancED
- Schools: 8
- NCES District ID: 0505680

Students and staff
- Students: 4,664
- Teachers: 339.23 (on FTE basis)
- Student–teacher ratio: 13.75

Other information
- Website: www.eldoradopublicschools.org

El Dorado School District is a public school district based in El Dorado, Arkansas, United States. The El Dorado School District provides early childhood, elementary and secondary education for more than 4,600 prekindergarten through grade 12 students at its eight facilities within Union County, Arkansas.

The district includes all of El Dorado. It also includes the unincorporated areas of Lawson and Urbana.

El Dorado School District is accredited by the Arkansas Department of Education (ADE) with the high school accredited by AdvancED since 1937.

== History ==
In 1978 the Lawson and Urbana school districts merged into the El Dorado district.

== Schools ==
Secondary schools

- El Dorado High School—serving more than 1,300 students in grades 9 through 12.
- Barton Junior High School—serving more than 600 students in grades 7 and 8.

Elementary schools

- Washington Middle School—serving grades 5 and 6.
- Hugh Goodwin Elementary School—serving more than 400 students in kindergarten through grade 4.
- Northwest Elementary School—serving more than 400 students in kindergarten through grade 4.
- Yocum Elementary School- serving more the 500 students in kindergarten through grade 4.
- Yocum Primary School
