= Vieux Carré (play) =

1977 play by Tennessee Williams

First edition cover (New Directions)

Vieux Carré (1977) is a play by Tennessee Williams. Referring to the French term for the French Quarter, it is a semi-autobiographical play set in New Orleans. Although he began writing the play shortly after moving to New Orleans from St. Louis in 1938, Williams did not complete it for nearly 40 years.

Drawing on earlier writings, Williams wrote most of the play in 1976. He prepared revisions for its New York premiere in 1977 and for two productions in England in 1978. The revised text was published by New Directions in 1979.

== Synopsis ==
Set in the late 1930s in a dilapidated boarding house at 722 Toulouse Street in the French Quarter of New Orleans, the play focuses on a nameless writer, who has newly arrived from St. Louis. He is struggling as a young man with his writing career, poverty, loneliness, homosexuality, and a cataract. He gradually becomes involved with other residents, including Mrs. Wire, his manipulative landlady; Nightingale, an older, predatory, tubercular artist who refuses to accept his condition; Jane, a New Rochelle society girl dying of leukemia; her sexually ambiguous, drug-addicted lover Tye, who works as a bouncer in a strip club; Mary Maud and Miss Carrie, two eccentric, poor, elderly women, who are literally starving to death; and a gay photographer with a passion for orgies.

== Broadway production ==
Following 11 previews, the original Broadway production, directed by Arthur Allan Seidelman, opened on May 11, 1977 at the St. James Theatre. It closed after five performances. The cast included Richard Alfieri as the writer, Tom Aldredge as Nightingale, and Sylvia Sidney as Mrs. Wire. Galt MacDermot composed incidental music and co-wrote the songs "Sugar in the Cane" and "Lonesome Man" with Williams. The scenic and lighting designs were by James Tilton, and Jane Greenwood designed the costumes.

== Critical reception ==
In his 1977 review in The New York Times, Clive Barnes wrote

Is Vieux Carre a good play? Probably not. But it depends what you mean by good. It is a play of blatant melodrama and crepuscular atmosphere — poetically speaking, and he never tried anything less; Mr. Williams always writes of violence at twilight. Its qualities are those of texture rather than form. It is a series of vignettes, based on fact, falsified by art, transformed into short stories, and woven into a play...If we always expect the unexpected to happen—and as playgoers we do—nothing happens. And the play has no structures other than the interweaving of caricatured characters. Yet it has a haunting nature — you leave the theater with the impression of having been told a secret. Not necessarily a truth, but a secret...And it is unquestionably, the murmurings of genius, not a major statement. Yet beneath those murmurings, through the meanderings, is an authentic voice of the 20th-century theater. It is slight but not negligible. Which, considering so many dramas, is a pleasant reversal."

The play has been produced many times since its premiere in New York. A critic covering a 2008 production in St. Louis wrote "This semi-autobiographical account of an innocent young writer being exposed to illness and death, love and violence in a seedy boarding house intrigues both as one of Williams' earliest — and also as one of his final — works."
