= El Dorado High School (Arkansas) =

Location
- 2000 Wildcat Drive; El Dorado, Arkansas 71730; United States; 33°12′59″N 92°41′6″W

Information
- Type: Public secondary
- Established: 1929 (97 years ago)
- Status: Open
- NCES School ID: 050568000274
- Principal: Sherry Hill
- Teaching staff: 104.43 (FTE)
- Grades: 9–12
- Enrollment: 1,220 (2023-2024)
- Student to teacher ratio: 11.68
- Colors: Purple and white
- Mascot: Wildcat
- Website: www.eldoradopublicschools.org/o/ehs

El Dorado High School is an accredited comprehensive public secondary school located in El Dorado, Arkansas, United States. The high school serves students in grades 9 through 12 for the community of El Dorado and surrounding unincorporated communities in Union County, Arkansas. The school is administered by the El Dorado School District. Its principal is Sherry Hill. The school has won 26 state athletic championships.

== Academics ==
The assumed course of study for students follows the Smart Core curriculum developed by the Arkansas Department of Education (ADE). Students complete regular (core and elective) and career focus courses and exams, and may select Advanced Placement (AP) coursework and exams that provide an opportunity for college credit.

In 2011, El Dorado School District and its high school were recognized in the AP District of the Year Awards program in the College Board's 1st Annual Honor Roll. This consisted of 388 U.S. public school districts (two in Arkansas) that simultaneously achieved increases in access to AP courses for a broader number of students, and improved the rate at which their AP students earned scores of 3 or higher on an AP exam.

== Campus history ==
In March 2009 a new high school construction began; it was completed in June 2011. The new school is for 1,500 students and is a 320,000 square feet (30,000 m^{2}) two-story structure made of wood, masonry, concrete and steel. Located in the original 1920s oil field, the project included a 2,000 seat arena/gymnasium, 450-seat fine arts auditorium and seven classroom zones on a site totaling 62 acres.

Murphy Oil's $50 million gift to education in El Dorado set the wheels in motion for the new school.

The new EHS also includes more than 100 classrooms and instructional spaces, six dedicated computer labs, media center, theater with sloped and tiered lecture seating, basketball arena, 75-seat “black box” theatre, 13 science labs, “Main Street” circulation corridors and central octunda, and 8,000 sq ft (740 m^{2}) student dining/commons with serving area.

== Extracurricular activities ==
The El Dorado High School mascot and athletic emblem is the wildcat, with purple and white serving as the school colors.

The El Dorado Wildcats and Ladycats compete in several interscholastic athletic activities, including football, cross country, baseball, girls' softball, basketball, golf, track & field, girls' volleyball, tennis, and soccer. In 2012–14, EHS was a member of the 6A Classification and the 7A/6A South Conference as administered by the Arkansas Activities Association.

=== Football ===
The El Dorado High School football team are ten-time state champions and are the 2009, 2010, 2011, 2013, and 2021 6A Arkansas State Champions, previously winning state football championships in 1924, 1932, 1933, 1942 and 1958. They made it to the 6A Arkansas State Finals in five out of the six years starting in 2008.

=== Basketball ===
==== Wildcat basketball ====
The boys' basketball team are two-time state basketball champions, having won title games in 1976 and 1982.

==== LadyCat basketball ====
At the conclusion of the 2011 LadyCat basketball season, the El Dorado LadyCat basketball team earned its first state championship in school history.

=== Golf ===
The Wildcats boys’ golf team are one of the state's most successful as nine-time state golf champions, winning four consecutive titles (1950–53), three consecutive titles (1966–68), and titles in 1973, 1987, and 2020.

The girls' team also won the state championship in 2000, 2002, 2004, 2007, 2009 and 2010.

=== Swimming ===
The boys' swimming team won its only state swimming championship in 1965.

=== Baseball ===
The 2012 Wildcats won the 6A State Championship.

=== Performing Arts ===
==== Theatre ====
Thespian Troupe 42 is one of the oldest International Thespian Society troupes in the world.

== School description ==
=== School district details ===
- Graduation rate: 77.1%
- Dropout rate: 2.0%
- Students per teacher: 14.0
- Enrolled students in district: 4,643
- Enrolled students in El Dorado High School: 1,368
- Ranks 204 out of 278 high schools in Arkansas

=== Faculty details and student enrollment ===
==== Students and faculty ====
- Total students enrolled: 1,368
- Average student to teacher ratio: 12.8

==== Student gender breakdown ====
- Males: 679 (49.6%)
- Females: 689 (50.4%)

==== Free lunch eligibility breakdown ====
- Eligible for reduced lunch: 90 (6.6%)
- Eligible for free lunch: 621 (45.4%)

==== Student enrollment distribution by race / ethnicity ====
Race	Number	Percent
American Indian	2	0.1%
Black	692	50.6%
Asian	16	1.2%
Hispanic	43	3.1%
White (Non-Hispanic)	612	44.7%

== Notable alumni ==
- Donna Axum — Miss America 1964
- Daniel Gafford — Dallas Mavericks center (NBA); 2017 Arkansas Gatorade Player of the Year
- Glen Ray Hines — former professional football player (NFL)
- Jim Mooty — former professional football player (NFL)
- Buster Raborn — former professional football player (NFL)
- Schoolboy Rowe — former professional baseball player (MLB)
- R. B. Sprague — artist; contemporary and realist painting
- J. R. Williamson — former professional football player (NFL)
